

441001–441100 

|-bgcolor=#fefefe
| 441001 ||  || — || January 25, 2007 || Catalina || CSS || H || align=right data-sort-value="0.55" | 550 m || 
|-id=002 bgcolor=#fefefe
| 441002 ||  || — || February 19, 2007 || Mount Lemmon || Mount Lemmon Survey || — || align=right data-sort-value="0.68" | 680 m || 
|-id=003 bgcolor=#fefefe
| 441003 ||  || — || February 23, 2007 || Kitt Peak || Spacewatch || — || align=right data-sort-value="0.65" | 650 m || 
|-id=004 bgcolor=#fefefe
| 441004 ||  || — || February 17, 2007 || Kitt Peak || Spacewatch || — || align=right data-sort-value="0.71" | 710 m || 
|-id=005 bgcolor=#d6d6d6
| 441005 ||  || — || February 23, 2007 || Socorro || LINEAR || — || align=right | 4.8 km || 
|-id=006 bgcolor=#fefefe
| 441006 ||  || — || February 23, 2007 || Mount Lemmon || Mount Lemmon Survey || — || align=right data-sort-value="0.86" | 860 m || 
|-id=007 bgcolor=#fefefe
| 441007 ||  || — || January 27, 2007 || Mount Lemmon || Mount Lemmon Survey || — || align=right data-sort-value="0.68" | 680 m || 
|-id=008 bgcolor=#d6d6d6
| 441008 ||  || — || February 8, 2007 || Kitt Peak || Spacewatch || URS || align=right | 3.7 km || 
|-id=009 bgcolor=#d6d6d6
| 441009 ||  || — || February 16, 2007 || Catalina || CSS || — || align=right | 3.1 km || 
|-id=010 bgcolor=#fefefe
| 441010 ||  || — || October 28, 2005 || Kitt Peak || Spacewatch || — || align=right data-sort-value="0.55" | 550 m || 
|-id=011 bgcolor=#fefefe
| 441011 ||  || — || February 26, 2007 || Mount Lemmon || Mount Lemmon Survey || — || align=right data-sort-value="0.67" | 670 m || 
|-id=012 bgcolor=#fefefe
| 441012 ||  || — || March 9, 2007 || Kitt Peak || Spacewatch || MAS || align=right data-sort-value="0.64" | 640 m || 
|-id=013 bgcolor=#fefefe
| 441013 ||  || — || March 10, 2007 || Kitt Peak || Spacewatch || — || align=right data-sort-value="0.75" | 750 m || 
|-id=014 bgcolor=#d6d6d6
| 441014 ||  || — || October 5, 2004 || Kitt Peak || Spacewatch || — || align=right | 3.5 km || 
|-id=015 bgcolor=#fefefe
| 441015 ||  || — || March 12, 2007 || Kitt Peak || Spacewatch || — || align=right data-sort-value="0.94" | 940 m || 
|-id=016 bgcolor=#d6d6d6
| 441016 ||  || — || March 12, 2007 || Kitt Peak || Spacewatch || — || align=right | 3.8 km || 
|-id=017 bgcolor=#fefefe
| 441017 ||  || — || March 13, 2007 || Mount Lemmon || Mount Lemmon Survey || — || align=right data-sort-value="0.71" | 710 m || 
|-id=018 bgcolor=#fefefe
| 441018 ||  || — || March 9, 2007 || Mount Lemmon || Mount Lemmon Survey || MAS || align=right data-sort-value="0.75" | 750 m || 
|-id=019 bgcolor=#d6d6d6
| 441019 ||  || — || January 29, 2007 || Kitt Peak || Spacewatch || — || align=right | 2.9 km || 
|-id=020 bgcolor=#fefefe
| 441020 ||  || — || February 26, 2007 || Mount Lemmon || Mount Lemmon Survey || — || align=right data-sort-value="0.75" | 750 m || 
|-id=021 bgcolor=#fefefe
| 441021 ||  || — || February 26, 2007 || Mount Lemmon || Mount Lemmon Survey || — || align=right data-sort-value="0.82" | 820 m || 
|-id=022 bgcolor=#fefefe
| 441022 ||  || — || March 14, 2007 || Kitt Peak || Spacewatch || — || align=right data-sort-value="0.79" | 790 m || 
|-id=023 bgcolor=#d6d6d6
| 441023 ||  || — || February 8, 2007 || Kitt Peak || Spacewatch || — || align=right | 3.1 km || 
|-id=024 bgcolor=#fefefe
| 441024 ||  || — || March 10, 2007 || Kitt Peak || Spacewatch || — || align=right data-sort-value="0.82" | 820 m || 
|-id=025 bgcolor=#fefefe
| 441025 ||  || — || March 14, 2007 || Mount Lemmon || Mount Lemmon Survey || V || align=right data-sort-value="0.66" | 660 m || 
|-id=026 bgcolor=#d6d6d6
| 441026 ||  || — || March 14, 2007 || Socorro || LINEAR || — || align=right | 3.3 km || 
|-id=027 bgcolor=#fefefe
| 441027 ||  || — || March 15, 2007 || Kitt Peak || Spacewatch || — || align=right data-sort-value="0.60" | 600 m || 
|-id=028 bgcolor=#fefefe
| 441028 ||  || — || March 8, 2007 || Palomar || NEAT || — || align=right data-sort-value="0.76" | 760 m || 
|-id=029 bgcolor=#fefefe
| 441029 ||  || — || March 15, 2007 || Kitt Peak || Spacewatch || — || align=right data-sort-value="0.79" | 790 m || 
|-id=030 bgcolor=#fefefe
| 441030 ||  || — || March 13, 2007 || Mount Lemmon || Mount Lemmon Survey || — || align=right data-sort-value="0.66" | 660 m || 
|-id=031 bgcolor=#fefefe
| 441031 ||  || — || March 16, 2007 || Catalina || CSS || — || align=right | 1.0 km || 
|-id=032 bgcolor=#d6d6d6
| 441032 ||  || — || March 16, 2007 || Mount Lemmon || Mount Lemmon Survey || — || align=right | 2.9 km || 
|-id=033 bgcolor=#fefefe
| 441033 ||  || — || March 19, 2007 || Catalina || CSS || — || align=right data-sort-value="0.87" | 870 m || 
|-id=034 bgcolor=#fefefe
| 441034 ||  || — || March 20, 2007 || Purple Mountain || PMO NEO || — || align=right data-sort-value="0.76" | 760 m || 
|-id=035 bgcolor=#fefefe
| 441035 ||  || — || March 20, 2007 || Kitt Peak || Spacewatch || MAS || align=right data-sort-value="0.64" | 640 m || 
|-id=036 bgcolor=#fefefe
| 441036 ||  || — || April 11, 2007 || Kitt Peak || Spacewatch || NYS || align=right data-sort-value="0.70" | 700 m || 
|-id=037 bgcolor=#fefefe
| 441037 ||  || — || April 11, 2007 || Mount Lemmon || Mount Lemmon Survey || — || align=right data-sort-value="0.68" | 680 m || 
|-id=038 bgcolor=#fefefe
| 441038 ||  || — || April 11, 2007 || Mount Lemmon || Mount Lemmon Survey || V || align=right data-sort-value="0.62" | 620 m || 
|-id=039 bgcolor=#fefefe
| 441039 ||  || — || April 15, 2007 || Kitt Peak || Spacewatch || — || align=right data-sort-value="0.68" | 680 m || 
|-id=040 bgcolor=#fefefe
| 441040 ||  || — || April 15, 2007 || Kitt Peak || Spacewatch || — || align=right data-sort-value="0.82" | 820 m || 
|-id=041 bgcolor=#fefefe
| 441041 ||  || — || April 15, 2007 || Kitt Peak || Spacewatch || CLA || align=right | 1.6 km || 
|-id=042 bgcolor=#fefefe
| 441042 ||  || — || March 26, 2007 || Mount Lemmon || Mount Lemmon Survey || — || align=right data-sort-value="0.71" | 710 m || 
|-id=043 bgcolor=#fefefe
| 441043 ||  || — || March 29, 2007 || Kitt Peak || Spacewatch || NYS || align=right data-sort-value="0.77" | 770 m || 
|-id=044 bgcolor=#fefefe
| 441044 ||  || — || April 19, 2007 || Mount Lemmon || Mount Lemmon Survey || MAS || align=right data-sort-value="0.63" | 630 m || 
|-id=045 bgcolor=#fefefe
| 441045 ||  || — || April 20, 2007 || Socorro || LINEAR || — || align=right | 1.0 km || 
|-id=046 bgcolor=#fefefe
| 441046 ||  || — || April 18, 2007 || Kitt Peak || Spacewatch || — || align=right data-sort-value="0.75" | 750 m || 
|-id=047 bgcolor=#fefefe
| 441047 ||  || — || April 22, 2007 || Mount Lemmon || Mount Lemmon Survey || NYS || align=right data-sort-value="0.72" | 720 m || 
|-id=048 bgcolor=#fefefe
| 441048 ||  || — || April 22, 2007 || Mount Lemmon || Mount Lemmon Survey || — || align=right data-sort-value="0.98" | 980 m || 
|-id=049 bgcolor=#fefefe
| 441049 ||  || — || April 11, 2007 || Kitt Peak || Spacewatch || — || align=right data-sort-value="0.80" | 800 m || 
|-id=050 bgcolor=#fefefe
| 441050 ||  || — || May 7, 2007 || Kitt Peak || Spacewatch || MAS || align=right data-sort-value="0.68" | 680 m || 
|-id=051 bgcolor=#fefefe
| 441051 ||  || — || May 11, 2007 || Kitt Peak || Spacewatch || MAS || align=right data-sort-value="0.75" | 750 m || 
|-id=052 bgcolor=#fefefe
| 441052 ||  || — || May 11, 2007 || Mount Lemmon || Mount Lemmon Survey || — || align=right | 1.1 km || 
|-id=053 bgcolor=#fefefe
| 441053 ||  || — || June 9, 2007 || Kitt Peak || Spacewatch || — || align=right data-sort-value="0.95" | 950 m || 
|-id=054 bgcolor=#fefefe
| 441054 ||  || — || June 10, 2007 || Kitt Peak || Spacewatch || — || align=right data-sort-value="0.97" | 970 m || 
|-id=055 bgcolor=#fefefe
| 441055 ||  || — || June 14, 2007 || Kitt Peak || Spacewatch || NYS || align=right data-sort-value="0.64" | 640 m || 
|-id=056 bgcolor=#fefefe
| 441056 ||  || — || April 19, 2007 || Mount Lemmon || Mount Lemmon Survey || MAS || align=right data-sort-value="0.63" | 630 m || 
|-id=057 bgcolor=#E9E9E9
| 441057 ||  || — || August 12, 2007 || Altschwendt || W. Ries || — || align=right | 2.8 km || 
|-id=058 bgcolor=#FFC2E0
| 441058 ||  || — || August 12, 2007 || Siding Spring || SSS || APO +1km || align=right | 1.8 km || 
|-id=059 bgcolor=#fefefe
| 441059 ||  || — || August 9, 2007 || Socorro || LINEAR || H || align=right data-sort-value="0.65" | 650 m || 
|-id=060 bgcolor=#E9E9E9
| 441060 ||  || — || August 13, 2007 || Siding Spring || SSS || — || align=right | 1.5 km || 
|-id=061 bgcolor=#E9E9E9
| 441061 ||  || — || August 24, 2007 || Kitt Peak || Spacewatch || — || align=right data-sort-value="0.91" | 910 m || 
|-id=062 bgcolor=#E9E9E9
| 441062 ||  || — || August 24, 2007 || Kitt Peak || Spacewatch || critical || align=right data-sort-value="0.68" | 680 m || 
|-id=063 bgcolor=#E9E9E9
| 441063 ||  || — || September 3, 2007 || Catalina || CSS || — || align=right data-sort-value="0.89" | 890 m || 
|-id=064 bgcolor=#E9E9E9
| 441064 ||  || — || September 7, 2007 || La Sagra || OAM Obs. || — || align=right data-sort-value="0.86" | 860 m || 
|-id=065 bgcolor=#E9E9E9
| 441065 ||  || — || September 10, 2007 || Dauban || Chante-Perdrix Obs. || — || align=right data-sort-value="0.65" | 650 m || 
|-id=066 bgcolor=#fefefe
| 441066 ||  || — || January 24, 2006 || Anderson Mesa || LONEOS || H || align=right data-sort-value="0.60" | 600 m || 
|-id=067 bgcolor=#E9E9E9
| 441067 ||  || — || September 5, 2007 || Anderson Mesa || LONEOS || — || align=right | 2.3 km || 
|-id=068 bgcolor=#fefefe
| 441068 ||  || — || September 5, 2007 || Anderson Mesa || LONEOS || H || align=right data-sort-value="0.65" | 650 m || 
|-id=069 bgcolor=#E9E9E9
| 441069 ||  || — || September 10, 2007 || Catalina || CSS || — || align=right | 2.3 km || 
|-id=070 bgcolor=#E9E9E9
| 441070 ||  || — || September 10, 2007 || Mount Lemmon || Mount Lemmon Survey || — || align=right | 1.4 km || 
|-id=071 bgcolor=#E9E9E9
| 441071 ||  || — || September 10, 2007 || Mount Lemmon || Mount Lemmon Survey || — || align=right data-sort-value="0.82" | 820 m || 
|-id=072 bgcolor=#d6d6d6
| 441072 ||  || — || September 10, 2007 || Mount Lemmon || Mount Lemmon Survey || SHU3:2 || align=right | 5.6 km || 
|-id=073 bgcolor=#E9E9E9
| 441073 ||  || — || September 10, 2007 || Mount Lemmon || Mount Lemmon Survey || — || align=right | 1.2 km || 
|-id=074 bgcolor=#E9E9E9
| 441074 ||  || — || September 10, 2007 || Mount Lemmon || Mount Lemmon Survey || — || align=right data-sort-value="0.67" | 670 m || 
|-id=075 bgcolor=#d6d6d6
| 441075 ||  || — || September 11, 2007 || Mount Lemmon || Mount Lemmon Survey || 3:2 || align=right | 5.1 km || 
|-id=076 bgcolor=#E9E9E9
| 441076 ||  || — || September 11, 2007 || Kitt Peak || Spacewatch || — || align=right | 1.2 km || 
|-id=077 bgcolor=#E9E9E9
| 441077 ||  || — || September 12, 2007 || Mount Lemmon || Mount Lemmon Survey || — || align=right data-sort-value="0.80" | 800 m || 
|-id=078 bgcolor=#fefefe
| 441078 ||  || — || September 15, 2007 || Mount Lemmon || Mount Lemmon Survey || H || align=right data-sort-value="0.78" | 780 m || 
|-id=079 bgcolor=#E9E9E9
| 441079 ||  || — || September 10, 2007 || Kitt Peak || Spacewatch || — || align=right | 1.3 km || 
|-id=080 bgcolor=#E9E9E9
| 441080 ||  || — || August 24, 2007 || Kitt Peak || Spacewatch || — || align=right | 1.3 km || 
|-id=081 bgcolor=#E9E9E9
| 441081 ||  || — || September 10, 2007 || Kitt Peak || Spacewatch || — || align=right data-sort-value="0.66" | 660 m || 
|-id=082 bgcolor=#E9E9E9
| 441082 ||  || — || September 10, 2007 || Kitt Peak || Spacewatch || — || align=right data-sort-value="0.64" | 640 m || 
|-id=083 bgcolor=#E9E9E9
| 441083 ||  || — || September 10, 2007 || Kitt Peak || Spacewatch || — || align=right data-sort-value="0.94" | 940 m || 
|-id=084 bgcolor=#E9E9E9
| 441084 ||  || — || September 12, 2007 || Kitt Peak || Spacewatch || — || align=right data-sort-value="0.86" | 860 m || 
|-id=085 bgcolor=#E9E9E9
| 441085 ||  || — || September 13, 2007 || Mount Lemmon || Mount Lemmon Survey || — || align=right data-sort-value="0.87" | 870 m || 
|-id=086 bgcolor=#E9E9E9
| 441086 ||  || — || September 10, 2007 || Catalina || CSS || — || align=right | 1.4 km || 
|-id=087 bgcolor=#E9E9E9
| 441087 ||  || — || October 19, 2003 || Kitt Peak || Spacewatch || — || align=right | 1.0 km || 
|-id=088 bgcolor=#E9E9E9
| 441088 ||  || — || September 13, 2007 || Kitt Peak || Spacewatch || — || align=right | 1.3 km || 
|-id=089 bgcolor=#E9E9E9
| 441089 ||  || — || September 10, 2007 || Mount Lemmon || Mount Lemmon Survey || critical || align=right data-sort-value="0.57" | 570 m || 
|-id=090 bgcolor=#E9E9E9
| 441090 ||  || — || September 12, 2007 || Kitt Peak || Spacewatch || — || align=right | 1.4 km || 
|-id=091 bgcolor=#E9E9E9
| 441091 ||  || — || September 14, 2007 || Mount Lemmon || Mount Lemmon Survey || critical || align=right data-sort-value="0.65" | 650 m || 
|-id=092 bgcolor=#d6d6d6
| 441092 ||  || — || December 30, 2000 || Socorro || LINEAR || Tj (2.95) || align=right | 5.7 km || 
|-id=093 bgcolor=#E9E9E9
| 441093 ||  || — || September 10, 2007 || Catalina || CSS || MAR || align=right | 1.1 km || 
|-id=094 bgcolor=#E9E9E9
| 441094 ||  || — || September 13, 2007 || Mount Lemmon || Mount Lemmon Survey || — || align=right data-sort-value="0.84" | 840 m || 
|-id=095 bgcolor=#E9E9E9
| 441095 ||  || — || September 13, 2007 || Catalina || CSS || — || align=right | 2.3 km || 
|-id=096 bgcolor=#E9E9E9
| 441096 ||  || — || September 13, 2007 || Catalina || CSS || — || align=right | 1.2 km || 
|-id=097 bgcolor=#E9E9E9
| 441097 ||  || — || September 13, 2007 || Catalina || CSS || — || align=right | 1.4 km || 
|-id=098 bgcolor=#E9E9E9
| 441098 ||  || — || September 14, 2007 || Mount Lemmon || Mount Lemmon Survey || — || align=right data-sort-value="0.93" | 930 m || 
|-id=099 bgcolor=#E9E9E9
| 441099 ||  || — || September 14, 2007 || Socorro || LINEAR || — || align=right data-sort-value="0.78" | 780 m || 
|-id=100 bgcolor=#E9E9E9
| 441100 ||  || — || September 14, 2007 || Mount Lemmon || Mount Lemmon Survey || — || align=right | 1.2 km || 
|}

441101–441200 

|-bgcolor=#E9E9E9
| 441101 ||  || — || September 16, 2007 || Socorro || LINEAR || (5) || align=right data-sort-value="0.65" | 650 m || 
|-id=102 bgcolor=#E9E9E9
| 441102 ||  || — || October 25, 2003 || Socorro || LINEAR || — || align=right | 1.2 km || 
|-id=103 bgcolor=#FFC2E0
| 441103 ||  || — || September 21, 2007 || Catalina || CSS || AMO +1kmcritical || align=right data-sort-value="0.85" | 850 m || 
|-id=104 bgcolor=#E9E9E9
| 441104 ||  || — || September 21, 2007 || Purple Mountain || PMO NEO || — || align=right data-sort-value="0.87" | 870 m || 
|-id=105 bgcolor=#E9E9E9
| 441105 ||  || — || September 26, 2007 || Mount Lemmon || Mount Lemmon Survey || — || align=right | 1.6 km || 
|-id=106 bgcolor=#E9E9E9
| 441106 ||  || — || October 6, 2007 || La Sagra || OAM Obs. || — || align=right | 1.1 km || 
|-id=107 bgcolor=#E9E9E9
| 441107 ||  || — || October 4, 2007 || Catalina || CSS || — || align=right data-sort-value="0.71" | 710 m || 
|-id=108 bgcolor=#E9E9E9
| 441108 ||  || — || October 6, 2007 || Socorro || LINEAR || — || align=right | 1.3 km || 
|-id=109 bgcolor=#E9E9E9
| 441109 ||  || — || October 6, 2007 || Socorro || LINEAR || — || align=right | 1.3 km || 
|-id=110 bgcolor=#E9E9E9
| 441110 ||  || — || October 6, 2007 || Socorro || LINEAR || — || align=right | 1.9 km || 
|-id=111 bgcolor=#E9E9E9
| 441111 ||  || — || October 20, 2003 || Kitt Peak || Spacewatch || (5) || align=right data-sort-value="0.71" | 710 m || 
|-id=112 bgcolor=#fefefe
| 441112 ||  || — || October 9, 2007 || Socorro || LINEAR || H || align=right data-sort-value="0.81" | 810 m || 
|-id=113 bgcolor=#E9E9E9
| 441113 ||  || — || September 9, 2007 || Mount Lemmon || Mount Lemmon Survey || — || align=right | 1.5 km || 
|-id=114 bgcolor=#E9E9E9
| 441114 ||  || — || September 12, 2007 || Mount Lemmon || Mount Lemmon Survey || — || align=right data-sort-value="0.91" | 910 m || 
|-id=115 bgcolor=#E9E9E9
| 441115 ||  || — || October 4, 2007 || Kitt Peak || Spacewatch || — || align=right data-sort-value="0.72" | 720 m || 
|-id=116 bgcolor=#E9E9E9
| 441116 ||  || — || October 4, 2007 || Catalina || CSS || — || align=right | 1.2 km || 
|-id=117 bgcolor=#E9E9E9
| 441117 ||  || — || October 7, 2007 || Kitt Peak || Spacewatch || JUN || align=right | 1.1 km || 
|-id=118 bgcolor=#E9E9E9
| 441118 ||  || — || October 7, 2007 || Kitt Peak || Spacewatch || (5) || align=right data-sort-value="0.83" | 830 m || 
|-id=119 bgcolor=#E9E9E9
| 441119 ||  || — || September 14, 2007 || Mount Lemmon || Mount Lemmon Survey || — || align=right data-sort-value="0.86" | 860 m || 
|-id=120 bgcolor=#E9E9E9
| 441120 ||  || — || October 4, 2007 || Kitt Peak || Spacewatch || — || align=right data-sort-value="0.82" | 820 m || 
|-id=121 bgcolor=#E9E9E9
| 441121 ||  || — || October 7, 2007 || Mount Lemmon || Mount Lemmon Survey || — || align=right | 1.0 km || 
|-id=122 bgcolor=#E9E9E9
| 441122 ||  || — || September 15, 2007 || Mount Lemmon || Mount Lemmon Survey || critical || align=right | 1.2 km || 
|-id=123 bgcolor=#E9E9E9
| 441123 ||  || — || August 24, 2007 || Kitt Peak || Spacewatch || — || align=right data-sort-value="0.97" | 970 m || 
|-id=124 bgcolor=#E9E9E9
| 441124 ||  || — || September 11, 2007 || Mount Lemmon || Mount Lemmon Survey || (5) || align=right data-sort-value="0.61" | 610 m || 
|-id=125 bgcolor=#E9E9E9
| 441125 ||  || — || October 5, 2007 || Kitt Peak || Spacewatch || — || align=right | 1.3 km || 
|-id=126 bgcolor=#E9E9E9
| 441126 ||  || — || October 8, 2007 || Mount Lemmon || Mount Lemmon Survey || — || align=right data-sort-value="0.96" | 960 m || 
|-id=127 bgcolor=#E9E9E9
| 441127 ||  || — || October 8, 2007 || Mount Lemmon || Mount Lemmon Survey || MIS || align=right | 2.3 km || 
|-id=128 bgcolor=#E9E9E9
| 441128 ||  || — || October 8, 2007 || Mount Lemmon || Mount Lemmon Survey || — || align=right data-sort-value="0.85" | 850 m || 
|-id=129 bgcolor=#E9E9E9
| 441129 ||  || — || September 12, 2007 || Mount Lemmon || Mount Lemmon Survey || — || align=right data-sort-value="0.75" | 750 m || 
|-id=130 bgcolor=#E9E9E9
| 441130 ||  || — || December 12, 1999 || Kitt Peak || Spacewatch || — || align=right data-sort-value="0.98" | 980 m || 
|-id=131 bgcolor=#E9E9E9
| 441131 ||  || — || September 9, 2007 || Kitt Peak || Spacewatch || — || align=right | 1.9 km || 
|-id=132 bgcolor=#E9E9E9
| 441132 ||  || — || October 8, 2007 || Catalina || CSS || — || align=right data-sort-value="0.67" | 670 m || 
|-id=133 bgcolor=#E9E9E9
| 441133 ||  || — || November 21, 2003 || Kitt Peak || Spacewatch || — || align=right data-sort-value="0.75" | 750 m || 
|-id=134 bgcolor=#d6d6d6
| 441134 ||  || — || October 6, 2007 || Kitt Peak || Spacewatch || 3:2 || align=right | 4.1 km || 
|-id=135 bgcolor=#E9E9E9
| 441135 ||  || — || October 6, 2007 || Kitt Peak || Spacewatch || — || align=right | 1.3 km || 
|-id=136 bgcolor=#E9E9E9
| 441136 ||  || — || October 6, 2007 || Kitt Peak || Spacewatch || — || align=right | 1.3 km || 
|-id=137 bgcolor=#E9E9E9
| 441137 ||  || — || October 7, 2007 || Mount Lemmon || Mount Lemmon Survey || — || align=right data-sort-value="0.74" | 740 m || 
|-id=138 bgcolor=#E9E9E9
| 441138 ||  || — || October 9, 2007 || Catalina || CSS || — || align=right | 1.3 km || 
|-id=139 bgcolor=#E9E9E9
| 441139 ||  || — || September 11, 2007 || Catalina || CSS || — || align=right | 1.0 km || 
|-id=140 bgcolor=#E9E9E9
| 441140 ||  || — || October 15, 2007 || Siding Spring || SSS || — || align=right | 2.0 km || 
|-id=141 bgcolor=#E9E9E9
| 441141 ||  || — || October 6, 2007 || Socorro || LINEAR || — || align=right data-sort-value="0.91" | 910 m || 
|-id=142 bgcolor=#E9E9E9
| 441142 ||  || — || September 11, 2007 || Mount Lemmon || Mount Lemmon Survey || — || align=right | 1.9 km || 
|-id=143 bgcolor=#E9E9E9
| 441143 ||  || — || October 12, 2007 || Socorro || LINEAR || — || align=right data-sort-value="0.90" | 900 m || 
|-id=144 bgcolor=#FA8072
| 441144 ||  || — || October 8, 2007 || Anderson Mesa || LONEOS || — || align=right data-sort-value="0.78" | 780 m || 
|-id=145 bgcolor=#E9E9E9
| 441145 ||  || — || October 7, 2007 || Mount Lemmon || Mount Lemmon Survey || — || align=right | 1.3 km || 
|-id=146 bgcolor=#E9E9E9
| 441146 ||  || — || September 14, 2007 || Mount Lemmon || Mount Lemmon Survey || — || align=right | 1.6 km || 
|-id=147 bgcolor=#E9E9E9
| 441147 ||  || — || October 4, 2007 || Kitt Peak || Spacewatch || critical || align=right data-sort-value="0.57" | 570 m || 
|-id=148 bgcolor=#E9E9E9
| 441148 ||  || — || October 8, 2007 || Kitt Peak || Spacewatch || — || align=right | 1.2 km || 
|-id=149 bgcolor=#E9E9E9
| 441149 ||  || — || October 8, 2007 || Mount Lemmon || Mount Lemmon Survey || — || align=right | 1.4 km || 
|-id=150 bgcolor=#E9E9E9
| 441150 ||  || — || October 10, 2007 || Catalina || CSS || — || align=right | 1.8 km || 
|-id=151 bgcolor=#E9E9E9
| 441151 ||  || — || September 14, 2007 || Mount Lemmon || Mount Lemmon Survey || (5) || align=right data-sort-value="0.73" | 730 m || 
|-id=152 bgcolor=#E9E9E9
| 441152 ||  || — || October 9, 2007 || Kitt Peak || Spacewatch || critical || align=right data-sort-value="0.57" | 570 m || 
|-id=153 bgcolor=#E9E9E9
| 441153 ||  || — || October 9, 2007 || Kitt Peak || Spacewatch || — || align=right data-sort-value="0.86" | 860 m || 
|-id=154 bgcolor=#E9E9E9
| 441154 ||  || — || October 8, 2007 || Kitt Peak || Spacewatch || — || align=right data-sort-value="0.77" | 770 m || 
|-id=155 bgcolor=#E9E9E9
| 441155 ||  || — || October 8, 2007 || Kitt Peak || Spacewatch || MAR || align=right | 1.2 km || 
|-id=156 bgcolor=#E9E9E9
| 441156 ||  || — || October 8, 2007 || Kitt Peak || Spacewatch || — || align=right | 1.4 km || 
|-id=157 bgcolor=#E9E9E9
| 441157 ||  || — || October 8, 2007 || Kitt Peak || Spacewatch || — || align=right | 1.3 km || 
|-id=158 bgcolor=#E9E9E9
| 441158 ||  || — || October 10, 2007 || Anderson Mesa || LONEOS || (5) || align=right data-sort-value="0.81" | 810 m || 
|-id=159 bgcolor=#E9E9E9
| 441159 ||  || — || September 18, 2007 || Catalina || CSS || — || align=right data-sort-value="0.90" | 900 m || 
|-id=160 bgcolor=#E9E9E9
| 441160 ||  || — || October 10, 2007 || Kitt Peak || Spacewatch || JUN || align=right data-sort-value="0.99" | 990 m || 
|-id=161 bgcolor=#E9E9E9
| 441161 ||  || — || October 9, 2007 || Kitt Peak || Spacewatch || — || align=right | 1.2 km || 
|-id=162 bgcolor=#E9E9E9
| 441162 ||  || — || October 11, 2007 || Catalina || CSS || (5) || align=right data-sort-value="0.86" | 860 m || 
|-id=163 bgcolor=#E9E9E9
| 441163 ||  || — || October 11, 2007 || Mount Lemmon || Mount Lemmon Survey || (5) || align=right data-sort-value="0.60" | 600 m || 
|-id=164 bgcolor=#E9E9E9
| 441164 ||  || — || October 11, 2007 || Mount Lemmon || Mount Lemmon Survey || — || align=right | 1.9 km || 
|-id=165 bgcolor=#E9E9E9
| 441165 ||  || — || October 9, 2007 || Mount Lemmon || Mount Lemmon Survey || — || align=right data-sort-value="0.78" | 780 m || 
|-id=166 bgcolor=#E9E9E9
| 441166 ||  || — || October 11, 2007 || Mount Lemmon || Mount Lemmon Survey || (5) || align=right data-sort-value="0.77" | 770 m || 
|-id=167 bgcolor=#E9E9E9
| 441167 ||  || — || October 12, 2007 || Kitt Peak || Spacewatch || — || align=right | 1.2 km || 
|-id=168 bgcolor=#E9E9E9
| 441168 ||  || — || October 12, 2007 || Kitt Peak || Spacewatch || — || align=right data-sort-value="0.80" | 800 m || 
|-id=169 bgcolor=#E9E9E9
| 441169 ||  || — || October 11, 2007 || Kitt Peak || Spacewatch || (5) || align=right data-sort-value="0.74" | 740 m || 
|-id=170 bgcolor=#E9E9E9
| 441170 ||  || — || October 11, 2007 || Kitt Peak || Spacewatch || — || align=right data-sort-value="0.74" | 740 m || 
|-id=171 bgcolor=#E9E9E9
| 441171 ||  || — || October 14, 2007 || Mount Lemmon || Mount Lemmon Survey || (5) || align=right data-sort-value="0.79" | 790 m || 
|-id=172 bgcolor=#E9E9E9
| 441172 ||  || — || September 20, 2007 || Catalina || CSS || — || align=right | 1.1 km || 
|-id=173 bgcolor=#E9E9E9
| 441173 ||  || — || September 26, 2007 || Mount Lemmon || Mount Lemmon Survey || — || align=right data-sort-value="0.87" | 870 m || 
|-id=174 bgcolor=#E9E9E9
| 441174 ||  || — || October 12, 2007 || Catalina || CSS || — || align=right | 1.3 km || 
|-id=175 bgcolor=#E9E9E9
| 441175 ||  || — || October 13, 2007 || Mount Lemmon || Mount Lemmon Survey || (5) || align=right data-sort-value="0.70" | 700 m || 
|-id=176 bgcolor=#E9E9E9
| 441176 ||  || — || October 11, 2007 || Kitt Peak || Spacewatch || — || align=right | 1.8 km || 
|-id=177 bgcolor=#E9E9E9
| 441177 ||  || — || October 15, 2007 || Kitt Peak || Spacewatch || (5) || align=right data-sort-value="0.85" | 850 m || 
|-id=178 bgcolor=#fefefe
| 441178 ||  || — || October 13, 2007 || Catalina || CSS || H || align=right data-sort-value="0.75" | 750 m || 
|-id=179 bgcolor=#E9E9E9
| 441179 ||  || — || October 14, 2007 || Catalina || CSS || RAF || align=right data-sort-value="0.87" | 870 m || 
|-id=180 bgcolor=#E9E9E9
| 441180 ||  || — || October 7, 2007 || Mount Lemmon || Mount Lemmon Survey || — || align=right | 1.3 km || 
|-id=181 bgcolor=#E9E9E9
| 441181 ||  || — || October 7, 2007 || Mount Lemmon || Mount Lemmon Survey || — || align=right | 1.2 km || 
|-id=182 bgcolor=#E9E9E9
| 441182 ||  || — || October 8, 2007 || Catalina || CSS || — || align=right data-sort-value="0.82" | 820 m || 
|-id=183 bgcolor=#E9E9E9
| 441183 ||  || — || October 10, 2007 || Kitt Peak || Spacewatch || (5) || align=right data-sort-value="0.70" | 700 m || 
|-id=184 bgcolor=#E9E9E9
| 441184 ||  || — || October 12, 2007 || Kitt Peak || Spacewatch || — || align=right | 1.4 km || 
|-id=185 bgcolor=#E9E9E9
| 441185 ||  || — || October 12, 2007 || Mount Lemmon || Mount Lemmon Survey || NEM || align=right | 1.8 km || 
|-id=186 bgcolor=#d6d6d6
| 441186 ||  || — || October 10, 2007 || Catalina || CSS || 3:2 || align=right | 4.2 km || 
|-id=187 bgcolor=#E9E9E9
| 441187 ||  || — || October 11, 2007 || Kitt Peak || Spacewatch || — || align=right data-sort-value="0.70" | 700 m || 
|-id=188 bgcolor=#E9E9E9
| 441188 ||  || — || October 10, 2007 || Catalina || CSS || — || align=right | 1.5 km || 
|-id=189 bgcolor=#E9E9E9
| 441189 ||  || — || October 8, 2007 || Anderson Mesa || LONEOS || — || align=right data-sort-value="0.86" | 860 m || 
|-id=190 bgcolor=#E9E9E9
| 441190 ||  || — || October 15, 2007 || Mount Lemmon || Mount Lemmon Survey || — || align=right | 2.2 km || 
|-id=191 bgcolor=#E9E9E9
| 441191 ||  || — || October 16, 2007 || Catalina || CSS || (194) || align=right | 3.7 km || 
|-id=192 bgcolor=#E9E9E9
| 441192 ||  || — || September 15, 2007 || Catalina || CSS || — || align=right | 1.2 km || 
|-id=193 bgcolor=#E9E9E9
| 441193 ||  || — || September 20, 2007 || Catalina || CSS || critical || align=right | 1.4 km || 
|-id=194 bgcolor=#E9E9E9
| 441194 ||  || — || September 9, 2007 || Mount Lemmon || Mount Lemmon Survey || — || align=right data-sort-value="0.90" | 900 m || 
|-id=195 bgcolor=#E9E9E9
| 441195 ||  || — || October 8, 2007 || Kitt Peak || Spacewatch || — || align=right | 1.1 km || 
|-id=196 bgcolor=#E9E9E9
| 441196 ||  || — || October 7, 2007 || Kitt Peak || Spacewatch || — || align=right | 1.4 km || 
|-id=197 bgcolor=#E9E9E9
| 441197 ||  || — || October 10, 2007 || Kitt Peak || Spacewatch || — || align=right | 1.2 km || 
|-id=198 bgcolor=#E9E9E9
| 441198 ||  || — || October 30, 2007 || Mount Lemmon || Mount Lemmon Survey || (5) || align=right data-sort-value="0.69" | 690 m || 
|-id=199 bgcolor=#E9E9E9
| 441199 ||  || — || October 30, 2007 || Mount Lemmon || Mount Lemmon Survey || — || align=right | 1.8 km || 
|-id=200 bgcolor=#E9E9E9
| 441200 ||  || — || October 30, 2007 || Catalina || CSS || (5) || align=right data-sort-value="0.76" | 760 m || 
|}

441201–441300 

|-bgcolor=#E9E9E9
| 441201 ||  || — || October 10, 2007 || Catalina || CSS || BRG || align=right | 1.4 km || 
|-id=202 bgcolor=#E9E9E9
| 441202 ||  || — || October 30, 2007 || Kitt Peak || Spacewatch || — || align=right data-sort-value="0.86" | 860 m || 
|-id=203 bgcolor=#E9E9E9
| 441203 ||  || — || October 30, 2007 || Kitt Peak || Spacewatch || — || align=right | 1.1 km || 
|-id=204 bgcolor=#E9E9E9
| 441204 ||  || — || October 30, 2007 || Kitt Peak || Spacewatch || — || align=right | 2.0 km || 
|-id=205 bgcolor=#E9E9E9
| 441205 ||  || — || October 9, 2007 || Mount Lemmon || Mount Lemmon Survey || critical || align=right | 1.3 km || 
|-id=206 bgcolor=#E9E9E9
| 441206 ||  || — || October 20, 2007 || Mount Lemmon || Mount Lemmon Survey || AGN || align=right | 1.6 km || 
|-id=207 bgcolor=#E9E9E9
| 441207 ||  || — || October 31, 2007 || Mount Lemmon || Mount Lemmon Survey || — || align=right | 1.2 km || 
|-id=208 bgcolor=#E9E9E9
| 441208 ||  || — || October 31, 2007 || Catalina || CSS || — || align=right | 1.0 km || 
|-id=209 bgcolor=#E9E9E9
| 441209 ||  || — || October 17, 2007 || Mount Lemmon || Mount Lemmon Survey || — || align=right | 1.3 km || 
|-id=210 bgcolor=#E9E9E9
| 441210 ||  || — || October 14, 2007 || Mount Lemmon || Mount Lemmon Survey || — || align=right | 1.2 km || 
|-id=211 bgcolor=#E9E9E9
| 441211 ||  || — || November 1, 2007 || Kitt Peak || Spacewatch || — || align=right | 1.5 km || 
|-id=212 bgcolor=#E9E9E9
| 441212 ||  || — || November 1, 2007 || Kitt Peak || Spacewatch || — || align=right | 1.2 km || 
|-id=213 bgcolor=#E9E9E9
| 441213 ||  || — || October 21, 2007 || Mount Lemmon || Mount Lemmon Survey || — || align=right | 1.7 km || 
|-id=214 bgcolor=#E9E9E9
| 441214 ||  || — || October 8, 2007 || Mount Lemmon || Mount Lemmon Survey || — || align=right | 1.5 km || 
|-id=215 bgcolor=#E9E9E9
| 441215 ||  || — || November 3, 2007 || Mount Lemmon || Mount Lemmon Survey || 526 || align=right | 2.0 km || 
|-id=216 bgcolor=#E9E9E9
| 441216 ||  || — || October 16, 2007 || Mount Lemmon || Mount Lemmon Survey || — || align=right | 1.1 km || 
|-id=217 bgcolor=#E9E9E9
| 441217 ||  || — || November 1, 2007 || Kitt Peak || Spacewatch || (5) || align=right data-sort-value="0.64" | 640 m || 
|-id=218 bgcolor=#E9E9E9
| 441218 ||  || — || October 9, 2007 || Kitt Peak || Spacewatch || — || align=right | 1.7 km || 
|-id=219 bgcolor=#E9E9E9
| 441219 ||  || — || November 1, 2007 || Kitt Peak || Spacewatch || — || align=right | 1.4 km || 
|-id=220 bgcolor=#FA8072
| 441220 ||  || — || November 1, 2007 || Kitt Peak || Spacewatch || H || align=right data-sort-value="0.64" | 640 m || 
|-id=221 bgcolor=#E9E9E9
| 441221 ||  || — || October 14, 2007 || Mount Lemmon || Mount Lemmon Survey || — || align=right | 1.7 km || 
|-id=222 bgcolor=#E9E9E9
| 441222 ||  || — || November 1, 2007 || Kitt Peak || Spacewatch || — || align=right | 1.3 km || 
|-id=223 bgcolor=#E9E9E9
| 441223 ||  || — || November 3, 2007 || Kitt Peak || Spacewatch || — || align=right | 1.3 km || 
|-id=224 bgcolor=#E9E9E9
| 441224 ||  || — || October 15, 2007 || Kitt Peak || Spacewatch || — || align=right | 1.3 km || 
|-id=225 bgcolor=#E9E9E9
| 441225 ||  || — || November 2, 2007 || Socorro || LINEAR || — || align=right | 1.6 km || 
|-id=226 bgcolor=#E9E9E9
| 441226 ||  || — || October 16, 2007 || Mount Lemmon || Mount Lemmon Survey || — || align=right | 2.3 km || 
|-id=227 bgcolor=#E9E9E9
| 441227 ||  || — || November 3, 2007 || Kitt Peak || Spacewatch || AST || align=right | 1.6 km || 
|-id=228 bgcolor=#E9E9E9
| 441228 ||  || — || October 30, 2007 || Catalina || CSS || — || align=right | 1.8 km || 
|-id=229 bgcolor=#E9E9E9
| 441229 ||  || — || November 5, 2007 || XuYi || PMO NEO || BRG || align=right | 1.5 km || 
|-id=230 bgcolor=#E9E9E9
| 441230 ||  || — || October 15, 2007 || Kitt Peak || Spacewatch || — || align=right data-sort-value="0.99" | 990 m || 
|-id=231 bgcolor=#E9E9E9
| 441231 ||  || — || October 20, 2007 || Mount Lemmon || Mount Lemmon Survey || (5) || align=right data-sort-value="0.72" | 720 m || 
|-id=232 bgcolor=#E9E9E9
| 441232 ||  || — || January 16, 2004 || Kitt Peak || Spacewatch || — || align=right | 1.1 km || 
|-id=233 bgcolor=#E9E9E9
| 441233 ||  || — || November 5, 2007 || Kitt Peak || Spacewatch || — || align=right | 1.2 km || 
|-id=234 bgcolor=#E9E9E9
| 441234 ||  || — || November 5, 2007 || Kitt Peak || Spacewatch || — || align=right | 1.6 km || 
|-id=235 bgcolor=#E9E9E9
| 441235 ||  || — || October 31, 2007 || Mount Lemmon || Mount Lemmon Survey || — || align=right | 1.7 km || 
|-id=236 bgcolor=#E9E9E9
| 441236 ||  || — || November 2, 2007 || Kitt Peak || Spacewatch || MIS || align=right | 2.4 km || 
|-id=237 bgcolor=#E9E9E9
| 441237 ||  || — || November 11, 2007 || Mount Lemmon || Mount Lemmon Survey || — || align=right | 2.9 km || 
|-id=238 bgcolor=#E9E9E9
| 441238 ||  || — || November 9, 2007 || Kitt Peak || Spacewatch || — || align=right | 1.9 km || 
|-id=239 bgcolor=#E9E9E9
| 441239 ||  || — || November 9, 2007 || Kitt Peak || Spacewatch || — || align=right | 2.1 km || 
|-id=240 bgcolor=#E9E9E9
| 441240 ||  || — || November 12, 2007 || Mount Lemmon || Mount Lemmon Survey || MIS || align=right | 1.8 km || 
|-id=241 bgcolor=#E9E9E9
| 441241 ||  || — || November 15, 2007 || Mayhill || A. Lowe || — || align=right data-sort-value="0.96" | 960 m || 
|-id=242 bgcolor=#E9E9E9
| 441242 ||  || — || November 7, 2007 || Catalina || CSS || — || align=right | 1.2 km || 
|-id=243 bgcolor=#E9E9E9
| 441243 ||  || — || November 8, 2007 || Kitt Peak || Spacewatch || — || align=right | 1.2 km || 
|-id=244 bgcolor=#E9E9E9
| 441244 ||  || — || November 2, 2007 || Catalina || CSS || EUN || align=right | 1.4 km || 
|-id=245 bgcolor=#E9E9E9
| 441245 ||  || — || November 3, 2007 || Catalina || CSS || — || align=right data-sort-value="0.96" | 960 m || 
|-id=246 bgcolor=#E9E9E9
| 441246 ||  || — || November 9, 2007 || Mount Lemmon || Mount Lemmon Survey || EUN || align=right | 1.4 km || 
|-id=247 bgcolor=#E9E9E9
| 441247 ||  || — || November 9, 2007 || Catalina || CSS || — || align=right | 2.8 km || 
|-id=248 bgcolor=#E9E9E9
| 441248 ||  || — || October 10, 2007 || Kitt Peak || Spacewatch || — || align=right | 1.3 km || 
|-id=249 bgcolor=#E9E9E9
| 441249 ||  || — || November 13, 2007 || Mount Lemmon || Mount Lemmon Survey || — || align=right | 1.4 km || 
|-id=250 bgcolor=#E9E9E9
| 441250 ||  || — || October 16, 2007 || Mount Lemmon || Mount Lemmon Survey || — || align=right | 1.2 km || 
|-id=251 bgcolor=#E9E9E9
| 441251 ||  || — || November 5, 2007 || Kitt Peak || Spacewatch || (5) || align=right data-sort-value="0.84" | 840 m || 
|-id=252 bgcolor=#E9E9E9
| 441252 ||  || — || November 13, 2007 || Kitt Peak || Spacewatch || — || align=right | 1.9 km || 
|-id=253 bgcolor=#E9E9E9
| 441253 ||  || — || November 12, 2007 || Socorro || LINEAR || — || align=right | 1.3 km || 
|-id=254 bgcolor=#E9E9E9
| 441254 ||  || — || November 9, 2007 || Kitt Peak || Spacewatch || — || align=right | 1.5 km || 
|-id=255 bgcolor=#E9E9E9
| 441255 ||  || — || November 3, 2007 || Kitt Peak || Spacewatch || critical || align=right | 1.0 km || 
|-id=256 bgcolor=#E9E9E9
| 441256 ||  || — || November 12, 2007 || Mount Lemmon || Mount Lemmon Survey || WIT || align=right data-sort-value="0.88" | 880 m || 
|-id=257 bgcolor=#E9E9E9
| 441257 ||  || — || October 17, 2007 || Catalina || CSS || — || align=right | 1.9 km || 
|-id=258 bgcolor=#E9E9E9
| 441258 ||  || — || November 9, 2007 || Catalina || CSS || — || align=right | 1.0 km || 
|-id=259 bgcolor=#E9E9E9
| 441259 ||  || — || October 9, 2007 || Catalina || CSS || — || align=right | 1.2 km || 
|-id=260 bgcolor=#E9E9E9
| 441260 ||  || — || November 9, 2007 || Mount Lemmon || Mount Lemmon Survey || — || align=right | 1.7 km || 
|-id=261 bgcolor=#E9E9E9
| 441261 ||  || — || November 9, 2007 || Mount Lemmon || Mount Lemmon Survey || (5) || align=right data-sort-value="0.68" | 680 m || 
|-id=262 bgcolor=#E9E9E9
| 441262 ||  || — || November 8, 2007 || Kitt Peak || Spacewatch || (1547) || align=right | 1.7 km || 
|-id=263 bgcolor=#E9E9E9
| 441263 ||  || — || November 2, 2007 || Kitt Peak || Spacewatch || — || align=right | 2.5 km || 
|-id=264 bgcolor=#E9E9E9
| 441264 ||  || — || November 2, 2007 || Mount Lemmon || Mount Lemmon Survey || — || align=right | 1.5 km || 
|-id=265 bgcolor=#E9E9E9
| 441265 ||  || — || November 5, 2007 || Kitt Peak || Spacewatch || ADE || align=right | 1.5 km || 
|-id=266 bgcolor=#FA8072
| 441266 ||  || — || November 2, 2007 || Socorro || LINEAR || — || align=right | 1.6 km || 
|-id=267 bgcolor=#E9E9E9
| 441267 ||  || — || November 8, 2007 || Socorro || LINEAR || ADE || align=right | 1.8 km || 
|-id=268 bgcolor=#E9E9E9
| 441268 ||  || — || November 12, 2007 || Socorro || LINEAR || ADE || align=right | 1.9 km || 
|-id=269 bgcolor=#d6d6d6
| 441269 ||  || — || November 2, 2007 || Mount Lemmon || Mount Lemmon Survey || — || align=right | 3.3 km || 
|-id=270 bgcolor=#E9E9E9
| 441270 ||  || — || November 3, 2007 || Socorro || LINEAR || — || align=right | 3.8 km || 
|-id=271 bgcolor=#E9E9E9
| 441271 ||  || — || November 11, 2007 || Socorro || LINEAR || — || align=right | 1.6 km || 
|-id=272 bgcolor=#E9E9E9
| 441272 ||  || — || November 12, 2007 || Mount Lemmon || Mount Lemmon Survey || — || align=right | 2.0 km || 
|-id=273 bgcolor=#E9E9E9
| 441273 ||  || — || October 11, 2007 || Kitt Peak || Spacewatch || — || align=right | 1.2 km || 
|-id=274 bgcolor=#E9E9E9
| 441274 ||  || — || November 17, 2007 || Socorro || LINEAR || (194) || align=right | 2.5 km || 
|-id=275 bgcolor=#E9E9E9
| 441275 ||  || — || September 15, 2007 || Mount Lemmon || Mount Lemmon Survey || — || align=right | 1.0 km || 
|-id=276 bgcolor=#E9E9E9
| 441276 ||  || — || November 6, 2007 || Mount Lemmon || Mount Lemmon Survey || — || align=right | 1.4 km || 
|-id=277 bgcolor=#E9E9E9
| 441277 ||  || — || November 19, 2007 || Kitt Peak || Spacewatch || — || align=right | 1.7 km || 
|-id=278 bgcolor=#d6d6d6
| 441278 ||  || — || November 19, 2007 || Mount Lemmon || Mount Lemmon Survey || — || align=right | 3.2 km || 
|-id=279 bgcolor=#E9E9E9
| 441279 ||  || — || November 17, 2007 || Kitt Peak || Spacewatch || WIT || align=right | 1.1 km || 
|-id=280 bgcolor=#E9E9E9
| 441280 ||  || — || November 9, 2007 || Catalina || CSS || — || align=right | 1.3 km || 
|-id=281 bgcolor=#E9E9E9
| 441281 ||  || — || November 4, 2007 || Socorro || LINEAR || — || align=right | 1.4 km || 
|-id=282 bgcolor=#E9E9E9
| 441282 ||  || — || October 8, 2007 || Kitt Peak || Spacewatch || — || align=right | 1.7 km || 
|-id=283 bgcolor=#E9E9E9
| 441283 ||  || — || August 10, 2007 || Kitt Peak || Spacewatch || — || align=right | 1.7 km || 
|-id=284 bgcolor=#E9E9E9
| 441284 ||  || — || November 5, 2007 || Mount Lemmon || Mount Lemmon Survey || — || align=right | 2.5 km || 
|-id=285 bgcolor=#E9E9E9
| 441285 ||  || — || December 12, 2007 || Socorro || LINEAR || — || align=right | 3.7 km || 
|-id=286 bgcolor=#E9E9E9
| 441286 ||  || — || November 8, 2007 || Kitt Peak || Spacewatch || — || align=right | 2.5 km || 
|-id=287 bgcolor=#E9E9E9
| 441287 ||  || — || December 10, 2007 || Socorro || LINEAR || (5) || align=right data-sort-value="0.84" | 840 m || 
|-id=288 bgcolor=#E9E9E9
| 441288 ||  || — || November 14, 2007 || Mount Lemmon || Mount Lemmon Survey || — || align=right | 1.5 km || 
|-id=289 bgcolor=#E9E9E9
| 441289 ||  || — || October 15, 1998 || Kitt Peak || Spacewatch || — || align=right | 1.1 km || 
|-id=290 bgcolor=#E9E9E9
| 441290 ||  || — || December 5, 2007 || Anderson Mesa || LONEOS || JUN || align=right | 1.2 km || 
|-id=291 bgcolor=#E9E9E9
| 441291 ||  || — || December 16, 2007 || Catalina || CSS || — || align=right | 1.8 km || 
|-id=292 bgcolor=#E9E9E9
| 441292 ||  || — || November 7, 2007 || Mount Lemmon || Mount Lemmon Survey || — || align=right | 2.2 km || 
|-id=293 bgcolor=#E9E9E9
| 441293 ||  || — || December 3, 2007 || Socorro || LINEAR || — || align=right | 2.6 km || 
|-id=294 bgcolor=#E9E9E9
| 441294 ||  || — || December 16, 2007 || Kitt Peak || Spacewatch || — || align=right | 1.5 km || 
|-id=295 bgcolor=#E9E9E9
| 441295 ||  || — || December 30, 2007 || Mount Lemmon || Mount Lemmon Survey || — || align=right | 1.9 km || 
|-id=296 bgcolor=#E9E9E9
| 441296 ||  || — || December 30, 2007 || Mount Lemmon || Mount Lemmon Survey || NEM || align=right | 2.3 km || 
|-id=297 bgcolor=#E9E9E9
| 441297 ||  || — || December 5, 2007 || Kitt Peak || Spacewatch || critical || align=right | 1.8 km || 
|-id=298 bgcolor=#E9E9E9
| 441298 ||  || — || December 30, 2007 || Catalina || CSS || — || align=right | 1.7 km || 
|-id=299 bgcolor=#d6d6d6
| 441299 ||  || — || December 31, 2007 || Kitt Peak || Spacewatch || — || align=right | 2.3 km || 
|-id=300 bgcolor=#E9E9E9
| 441300 ||  || — || December 30, 2007 || Kitt Peak || Spacewatch || — || align=right | 2.3 km || 
|}

441301–441400 

|-bgcolor=#d6d6d6
| 441301 ||  || — || December 31, 2007 || Kitt Peak || Spacewatch || EOS || align=right | 2.0 km || 
|-id=302 bgcolor=#E9E9E9
| 441302 ||  || — || November 11, 2007 || Mount Lemmon || Mount Lemmon Survey || ADE || align=right | 2.2 km || 
|-id=303 bgcolor=#E9E9E9
| 441303 ||  || — || January 9, 2008 || Lulin Observatory || LUSS || — || align=right | 1.5 km || 
|-id=304 bgcolor=#FFC2E0
| 441304 ||  || — || December 30, 2007 || Mount Lemmon || Mount Lemmon Survey || AMO || align=right data-sort-value="0.23" | 230 m || 
|-id=305 bgcolor=#E9E9E9
| 441305 ||  || — || January 10, 2008 || Mount Lemmon || Mount Lemmon Survey || DOR || align=right | 1.9 km || 
|-id=306 bgcolor=#E9E9E9
| 441306 ||  || — || January 10, 2008 || Mount Lemmon || Mount Lemmon Survey || — || align=right | 1.8 km || 
|-id=307 bgcolor=#d6d6d6
| 441307 ||  || — || January 10, 2008 || Mount Lemmon || Mount Lemmon Survey || — || align=right | 2.7 km || 
|-id=308 bgcolor=#E9E9E9
| 441308 ||  || — || December 30, 2007 || Kitt Peak || Spacewatch || — || align=right | 2.2 km || 
|-id=309 bgcolor=#E9E9E9
| 441309 ||  || — || November 11, 2007 || Mount Lemmon || Mount Lemmon Survey || — || align=right | 2.3 km || 
|-id=310 bgcolor=#d6d6d6
| 441310 ||  || — || January 11, 2008 || Kitt Peak || Spacewatch || — || align=right | 2.0 km || 
|-id=311 bgcolor=#d6d6d6
| 441311 ||  || — || December 16, 2007 || Socorro || LINEAR || Tj (2.99) || align=right | 4.5 km || 
|-id=312 bgcolor=#E9E9E9
| 441312 ||  || — || January 12, 2008 || Kitt Peak || Spacewatch || — || align=right | 2.2 km || 
|-id=313 bgcolor=#fefefe
| 441313 ||  || — || January 15, 2008 || Mount Lemmon || Mount Lemmon Survey || — || align=right data-sort-value="0.87" | 870 m || 
|-id=314 bgcolor=#E9E9E9
| 441314 ||  || — || January 13, 2008 || Kitt Peak || Spacewatch || — || align=right | 1.8 km || 
|-id=315 bgcolor=#E9E9E9
| 441315 ||  || — || December 4, 2007 || Mount Lemmon || Mount Lemmon Survey || AGN || align=right | 1.2 km || 
|-id=316 bgcolor=#E9E9E9
| 441316 ||  || — || January 6, 2008 || Mauna Kea || P. A. Wiegert || DOR || align=right | 1.8 km || 
|-id=317 bgcolor=#E9E9E9
| 441317 ||  || — || January 1, 2008 || Mount Lemmon || Mount Lemmon Survey || — || align=right | 3.6 km || 
|-id=318 bgcolor=#E9E9E9
| 441318 ||  || — || January 1, 2008 || Kitt Peak || Spacewatch || — || align=right | 1.8 km || 
|-id=319 bgcolor=#E9E9E9
| 441319 ||  || — || January 12, 2008 || Socorro || LINEAR || — || align=right | 2.1 km || 
|-id=320 bgcolor=#E9E9E9
| 441320 ||  || — || January 15, 2008 || Mount Lemmon || Mount Lemmon Survey || — || align=right | 2.2 km || 
|-id=321 bgcolor=#d6d6d6
| 441321 ||  || — || December 18, 2007 || Mount Lemmon || Mount Lemmon Survey || BRA || align=right | 1.2 km || 
|-id=322 bgcolor=#E9E9E9
| 441322 ||  || — || January 30, 2008 || Catalina || CSS || — || align=right | 2.2 km || 
|-id=323 bgcolor=#E9E9E9
| 441323 ||  || — || December 16, 2007 || Catalina || CSS || — || align=right | 1.9 km || 
|-id=324 bgcolor=#E9E9E9
| 441324 ||  || — || February 2, 2008 || Kitt Peak || Spacewatch || — || align=right | 2.3 km || 
|-id=325 bgcolor=#E9E9E9
| 441325 ||  || — || December 4, 2007 || Catalina || CSS || — || align=right | 2.9 km || 
|-id=326 bgcolor=#d6d6d6
| 441326 ||  || — || February 2, 2008 || Kitt Peak || Spacewatch || EOS || align=right | 1.8 km || 
|-id=327 bgcolor=#E9E9E9
| 441327 ||  || — || November 18, 2007 || Mount Lemmon || Mount Lemmon Survey || — || align=right | 2.2 km || 
|-id=328 bgcolor=#d6d6d6
| 441328 ||  || — || February 7, 2008 || Mount Lemmon || Mount Lemmon Survey || — || align=right | 2.7 km || 
|-id=329 bgcolor=#d6d6d6
| 441329 ||  || — || February 7, 2008 || Mount Lemmon || Mount Lemmon Survey || BRA || align=right | 1.2 km || 
|-id=330 bgcolor=#d6d6d6
| 441330 ||  || — || February 7, 2008 || Kitt Peak || Spacewatch || — || align=right | 2.0 km || 
|-id=331 bgcolor=#E9E9E9
| 441331 ||  || — || February 7, 2008 || Mount Lemmon || Mount Lemmon Survey || JUN || align=right | 1.0 km || 
|-id=332 bgcolor=#d6d6d6
| 441332 ||  || — || February 9, 2008 || Kitt Peak || Spacewatch || — || align=right | 3.2 km || 
|-id=333 bgcolor=#d6d6d6
| 441333 ||  || — || February 2, 2008 || Mount Lemmon || Mount Lemmon Survey || EOS || align=right | 1.6 km || 
|-id=334 bgcolor=#E9E9E9
| 441334 ||  || — || February 11, 2008 || Dauban || F. Kugel || — || align=right | 1.9 km || 
|-id=335 bgcolor=#d6d6d6
| 441335 ||  || — || December 30, 2007 || Mount Lemmon || Mount Lemmon Survey || — || align=right | 3.0 km || 
|-id=336 bgcolor=#d6d6d6
| 441336 ||  || — || February 8, 2008 || Kitt Peak || Spacewatch || — || align=right | 2.9 km || 
|-id=337 bgcolor=#d6d6d6
| 441337 ||  || — || January 30, 2008 || Mount Lemmon || Mount Lemmon Survey || — || align=right | 3.0 km || 
|-id=338 bgcolor=#d6d6d6
| 441338 ||  || — || February 8, 2008 || Mount Lemmon || Mount Lemmon Survey || — || align=right | 2.4 km || 
|-id=339 bgcolor=#d6d6d6
| 441339 ||  || — || February 8, 2008 || Kitt Peak || Spacewatch || — || align=right | 2.9 km || 
|-id=340 bgcolor=#d6d6d6
| 441340 ||  || — || February 8, 2008 || Kitt Peak || Spacewatch || — || align=right | 4.1 km || 
|-id=341 bgcolor=#d6d6d6
| 441341 ||  || — || February 2, 2008 || Kitt Peak || Spacewatch || — || align=right | 3.2 km || 
|-id=342 bgcolor=#d6d6d6
| 441342 ||  || — || February 9, 2008 || Kitt Peak || Spacewatch || — || align=right | 3.4 km || 
|-id=343 bgcolor=#d6d6d6
| 441343 ||  || — || February 9, 2008 || Mount Lemmon || Mount Lemmon Survey ||  || align=right | 2.6 km || 
|-id=344 bgcolor=#FA8072
| 441344 ||  || — || February 2, 2008 || Kitt Peak || Spacewatch || — || align=right data-sort-value="0.74" | 740 m || 
|-id=345 bgcolor=#d6d6d6
| 441345 ||  || — || February 2, 2008 || Kitt Peak || Spacewatch || THB || align=right | 2.4 km || 
|-id=346 bgcolor=#d6d6d6
| 441346 ||  || — || September 14, 2005 || Kitt Peak || Spacewatch || — || align=right | 2.3 km || 
|-id=347 bgcolor=#d6d6d6
| 441347 ||  || — || February 8, 2008 || Kitt Peak || Spacewatch || — || align=right | 2.3 km || 
|-id=348 bgcolor=#d6d6d6
| 441348 ||  || — || February 2, 2008 || Socorro || LINEAR || — || align=right | 3.0 km || 
|-id=349 bgcolor=#d6d6d6
| 441349 ||  || — || February 7, 2008 || Mount Lemmon || Mount Lemmon Survey || — || align=right | 2.9 km || 
|-id=350 bgcolor=#d6d6d6
| 441350 ||  || — || February 2, 2008 || Kitt Peak || Spacewatch || — || align=right | 2.6 km || 
|-id=351 bgcolor=#d6d6d6
| 441351 ||  || — || February 26, 2008 || Bisei SG Center || BATTeRS || — || align=right | 5.1 km || 
|-id=352 bgcolor=#E9E9E9
| 441352 ||  || — || January 11, 1999 || Kitt Peak || Spacewatch || — || align=right | 2.9 km || 
|-id=353 bgcolor=#d6d6d6
| 441353 ||  || — || February 7, 2008 || Kitt Peak || Spacewatch || — || align=right | 2.8 km || 
|-id=354 bgcolor=#d6d6d6
| 441354 ||  || — || February 24, 2008 || Kitt Peak || Spacewatch || — || align=right | 2.7 km || 
|-id=355 bgcolor=#d6d6d6
| 441355 ||  || — || February 11, 2008 || Kitt Peak || Spacewatch || — || align=right | 3.4 km || 
|-id=356 bgcolor=#d6d6d6
| 441356 ||  || — || February 10, 2008 || Mount Lemmon || Mount Lemmon Survey || — || align=right | 3.0 km || 
|-id=357 bgcolor=#d6d6d6
| 441357 ||  || — || February 29, 2008 || Mount Lemmon || Mount Lemmon Survey || — || align=right | 3.7 km || 
|-id=358 bgcolor=#E9E9E9
| 441358 ||  || — || February 28, 2008 || Mount Lemmon || Mount Lemmon Survey || NEM || align=right | 2.6 km || 
|-id=359 bgcolor=#d6d6d6
| 441359 ||  || — || February 12, 2008 || Kitt Peak || Spacewatch || EOS || align=right | 1.9 km || 
|-id=360 bgcolor=#d6d6d6
| 441360 ||  || — || February 28, 2008 || Mount Lemmon || Mount Lemmon Survey || — || align=right | 2.3 km || 
|-id=361 bgcolor=#d6d6d6
| 441361 ||  || — || February 28, 2008 || Mount Lemmon || Mount Lemmon Survey || — || align=right | 3.8 km || 
|-id=362 bgcolor=#d6d6d6
| 441362 ||  || — || February 10, 2008 || Mount Lemmon || Mount Lemmon Survey || — || align=right | 2.5 km || 
|-id=363 bgcolor=#d6d6d6
| 441363 ||  || — || February 26, 2008 || Mount Lemmon || Mount Lemmon Survey || BRA || align=right | 1.7 km || 
|-id=364 bgcolor=#d6d6d6
| 441364 ||  || — || February 28, 2008 || Kitt Peak || Spacewatch || THB || align=right | 3.2 km || 
|-id=365 bgcolor=#d6d6d6
| 441365 ||  || — || February 28, 2008 || Mount Lemmon || Mount Lemmon Survey || — || align=right | 2.5 km || 
|-id=366 bgcolor=#d6d6d6
| 441366 ||  || — || February 29, 2008 || Kitt Peak || Spacewatch || — || align=right | 2.7 km || 
|-id=367 bgcolor=#d6d6d6
| 441367 ||  || — || January 30, 2008 || Kitt Peak || Spacewatch || — || align=right | 4.0 km || 
|-id=368 bgcolor=#d6d6d6
| 441368 ||  || — || March 1, 2008 || Kitt Peak || Spacewatch || HYG || align=right | 2.5 km || 
|-id=369 bgcolor=#d6d6d6
| 441369 ||  || — || March 1, 2008 || Kitt Peak || Spacewatch || EOS || align=right | 1.9 km || 
|-id=370 bgcolor=#d6d6d6
| 441370 ||  || — || March 1, 2008 || Kitt Peak || Spacewatch || — || align=right | 2.4 km || 
|-id=371 bgcolor=#fefefe
| 441371 ||  || — || March 2, 2008 || Kitt Peak || Spacewatch || — || align=right data-sort-value="0.71" | 710 m || 
|-id=372 bgcolor=#d6d6d6
| 441372 ||  || — || February 12, 2008 || Mount Lemmon || Mount Lemmon Survey || EOS || align=right | 2.4 km || 
|-id=373 bgcolor=#d6d6d6
| 441373 ||  || — || March 2, 2008 || Kitt Peak || Spacewatch || — || align=right | 3.1 km || 
|-id=374 bgcolor=#d6d6d6
| 441374 ||  || — || March 4, 2008 || XuYi || PMO NEO || — || align=right | 3.4 km || 
|-id=375 bgcolor=#d6d6d6
| 441375 ||  || — || March 8, 2008 || Kitt Peak || Spacewatch || — || align=right | 2.8 km || 
|-id=376 bgcolor=#d6d6d6
| 441376 ||  || — || March 9, 2008 || Mount Lemmon || Mount Lemmon Survey || — || align=right | 2.8 km || 
|-id=377 bgcolor=#d6d6d6
| 441377 ||  || — || March 9, 2008 || Mount Lemmon || Mount Lemmon Survey || — || align=right | 2.6 km || 
|-id=378 bgcolor=#d6d6d6
| 441378 ||  || — || March 7, 2008 || Kitt Peak || Spacewatch || KOR || align=right | 1.3 km || 
|-id=379 bgcolor=#d6d6d6
| 441379 ||  || — || March 3, 2008 || Catalina || CSS || — || align=right | 3.2 km || 
|-id=380 bgcolor=#d6d6d6
| 441380 ||  || — || March 4, 2008 || Mount Lemmon || Mount Lemmon Survey || — || align=right | 3.5 km || 
|-id=381 bgcolor=#d6d6d6
| 441381 ||  || — || February 12, 2008 || Mount Lemmon || Mount Lemmon Survey || — || align=right | 3.4 km || 
|-id=382 bgcolor=#d6d6d6
| 441382 ||  || — || February 12, 2008 || Mount Lemmon || Mount Lemmon Survey || — || align=right | 3.8 km || 
|-id=383 bgcolor=#d6d6d6
| 441383 ||  || — || March 2, 2008 || Kitt Peak || Spacewatch || — || align=right | 2.5 km || 
|-id=384 bgcolor=#fefefe
| 441384 ||  || — || March 12, 2008 || Kitt Peak || Spacewatch || — || align=right data-sort-value="0.67" | 670 m || 
|-id=385 bgcolor=#d6d6d6
| 441385 ||  || — || March 25, 2008 || Kitt Peak || Spacewatch || — || align=right | 4.2 km || 
|-id=386 bgcolor=#d6d6d6
| 441386 ||  || — || March 1, 2008 || Kitt Peak || Spacewatch || — || align=right | 2.4 km || 
|-id=387 bgcolor=#d6d6d6
| 441387 ||  || — || March 27, 2008 || Kitt Peak || Spacewatch || — || align=right | 2.6 km || 
|-id=388 bgcolor=#d6d6d6
| 441388 ||  || — || March 27, 2008 || Kitt Peak || Spacewatch || — || align=right | 2.5 km || 
|-id=389 bgcolor=#d6d6d6
| 441389 ||  || — || March 5, 2008 || Mount Lemmon || Mount Lemmon Survey || — || align=right | 3.1 km || 
|-id=390 bgcolor=#d6d6d6
| 441390 ||  || — || March 27, 2008 || Kitt Peak || Spacewatch || — || align=right | 2.9 km || 
|-id=391 bgcolor=#d6d6d6
| 441391 ||  || — || February 8, 2008 || Kitt Peak || Spacewatch || — || align=right | 2.5 km || 
|-id=392 bgcolor=#fefefe
| 441392 ||  || — || March 28, 2008 || Kitt Peak || Spacewatch || — || align=right data-sort-value="0.61" | 610 m || 
|-id=393 bgcolor=#d6d6d6
| 441393 ||  || — || February 3, 2008 || Kitt Peak || Spacewatch || — || align=right | 3.0 km || 
|-id=394 bgcolor=#d6d6d6
| 441394 ||  || — || March 13, 2008 || Kitt Peak || Spacewatch || HYG || align=right | 2.5 km || 
|-id=395 bgcolor=#d6d6d6
| 441395 ||  || — || March 5, 2008 || Kitt Peak || Spacewatch || — || align=right | 2.5 km || 
|-id=396 bgcolor=#d6d6d6
| 441396 ||  || — || March 29, 2008 || Mount Lemmon || Mount Lemmon Survey || — || align=right | 2.2 km || 
|-id=397 bgcolor=#d6d6d6
| 441397 ||  || — || March 28, 2008 || Mount Lemmon || Mount Lemmon Survey || — || align=right | 2.5 km || 
|-id=398 bgcolor=#d6d6d6
| 441398 ||  || — || March 29, 2008 || Kitt Peak || Spacewatch || — || align=right | 2.8 km || 
|-id=399 bgcolor=#fefefe
| 441399 ||  || — || March 30, 2008 || Kitt Peak || Spacewatch || — || align=right data-sort-value="0.48" | 480 m || 
|-id=400 bgcolor=#fefefe
| 441400 ||  || — || March 30, 2008 || Kitt Peak || Spacewatch || — || align=right data-sort-value="0.61" | 610 m || 
|}

441401–441500 

|-bgcolor=#fefefe
| 441401 ||  || — || March 31, 2008 || Kitt Peak || Spacewatch || — || align=right data-sort-value="0.61" | 610 m || 
|-id=402 bgcolor=#d6d6d6
| 441402 ||  || — || August 22, 2004 || Kitt Peak || Spacewatch || — || align=right | 2.9 km || 
|-id=403 bgcolor=#fefefe
| 441403 ||  || — || March 28, 2008 || Mount Lemmon || Mount Lemmon Survey || — || align=right data-sort-value="0.57" | 570 m || 
|-id=404 bgcolor=#d6d6d6
| 441404 ||  || — || March 30, 2008 || Kitt Peak || Spacewatch || — || align=right | 4.6 km || 
|-id=405 bgcolor=#d6d6d6
| 441405 ||  || — || March 29, 2008 || Kitt Peak || Spacewatch || — || align=right | 3.5 km || 
|-id=406 bgcolor=#fefefe
| 441406 ||  || — || March 29, 2008 || Kitt Peak || Spacewatch || — || align=right data-sort-value="0.84" | 840 m || 
|-id=407 bgcolor=#d6d6d6
| 441407 ||  || — || March 31, 2008 || Catalina || CSS || — || align=right | 3.7 km || 
|-id=408 bgcolor=#d6d6d6
| 441408 || 2008 GA || — || April 1, 2008 || Piszkéstető || K. Sárneczky || — || align=right | 3.4 km || 
|-id=409 bgcolor=#d6d6d6
| 441409 ||  || — || February 13, 2008 || Catalina || CSS || — || align=right | 3.7 km || 
|-id=410 bgcolor=#fefefe
| 441410 ||  || — || April 1, 2008 || Kitt Peak || Spacewatch || — || align=right data-sort-value="0.80" | 800 m || 
|-id=411 bgcolor=#fefefe
| 441411 ||  || — || April 4, 2008 || Kitt Peak || Spacewatch || — || align=right data-sort-value="0.57" | 570 m || 
|-id=412 bgcolor=#d6d6d6
| 441412 ||  || — || April 1, 2008 || Mount Lemmon || Mount Lemmon Survey || — || align=right | 4.5 km || 
|-id=413 bgcolor=#d6d6d6
| 441413 ||  || — || March 4, 2008 || Mount Lemmon || Mount Lemmon Survey || — || align=right | 2.3 km || 
|-id=414 bgcolor=#d6d6d6
| 441414 ||  || — || April 3, 2008 || Kitt Peak || Spacewatch || 7:4 || align=right | 4.6 km || 
|-id=415 bgcolor=#fefefe
| 441415 ||  || — || April 3, 2008 || Mount Lemmon || Mount Lemmon Survey || — || align=right data-sort-value="0.66" | 660 m || 
|-id=416 bgcolor=#fefefe
| 441416 ||  || — || April 4, 2008 || Kitt Peak || Spacewatch || — || align=right data-sort-value="0.62" | 620 m || 
|-id=417 bgcolor=#d6d6d6
| 441417 ||  || — || April 4, 2008 || Kitt Peak || Spacewatch || EOS || align=right | 2.4 km || 
|-id=418 bgcolor=#d6d6d6
| 441418 ||  || — || April 5, 2008 || Mount Lemmon || Mount Lemmon Survey || — || align=right | 2.9 km || 
|-id=419 bgcolor=#d6d6d6
| 441419 ||  || — || April 5, 2008 || Mount Lemmon || Mount Lemmon Survey || — || align=right | 2.6 km || 
|-id=420 bgcolor=#fefefe
| 441420 ||  || — || April 5, 2008 || Mount Lemmon || Mount Lemmon Survey || — || align=right data-sort-value="0.62" | 620 m || 
|-id=421 bgcolor=#fefefe
| 441421 ||  || — || April 5, 2008 || Kitt Peak || Spacewatch || — || align=right data-sort-value="0.57" | 570 m || 
|-id=422 bgcolor=#d6d6d6
| 441422 ||  || — || April 5, 2008 || Catalina || CSS || — || align=right | 4.7 km || 
|-id=423 bgcolor=#d6d6d6
| 441423 ||  || — || March 12, 2008 || Mount Lemmon || Mount Lemmon Survey || — || align=right | 6.1 km || 
|-id=424 bgcolor=#d6d6d6
| 441424 ||  || — || April 3, 2008 || Kitt Peak || Spacewatch || — || align=right | 2.6 km || 
|-id=425 bgcolor=#fefefe
| 441425 ||  || — || March 29, 2008 || Kitt Peak || Spacewatch || — || align=right data-sort-value="0.57" | 570 m || 
|-id=426 bgcolor=#d6d6d6
| 441426 ||  || — || April 8, 2008 || Mount Lemmon || Mount Lemmon Survey || — || align=right | 3.3 km || 
|-id=427 bgcolor=#d6d6d6
| 441427 ||  || — || March 28, 2008 || Kitt Peak || Spacewatch || — || align=right | 3.2 km || 
|-id=428 bgcolor=#fefefe
| 441428 ||  || — || March 5, 2008 || Mount Lemmon || Mount Lemmon Survey || — || align=right data-sort-value="0.65" | 650 m || 
|-id=429 bgcolor=#d6d6d6
| 441429 ||  || — || April 14, 2008 || Mount Lemmon || Mount Lemmon Survey || — || align=right | 3.8 km || 
|-id=430 bgcolor=#d6d6d6
| 441430 ||  || — || April 14, 2008 || Mount Lemmon || Mount Lemmon Survey || — || align=right | 2.8 km || 
|-id=431 bgcolor=#d6d6d6
| 441431 ||  || — || April 13, 2008 || Mount Lemmon || Mount Lemmon Survey || — || align=right | 3.4 km || 
|-id=432 bgcolor=#d6d6d6
| 441432 ||  || — || April 3, 2008 || Kitt Peak || Spacewatch || — || align=right | 2.7 km || 
|-id=433 bgcolor=#fefefe
| 441433 ||  || — || March 12, 2008 || Kitt Peak || Spacewatch || critical || align=right data-sort-value="0.52" | 520 m || 
|-id=434 bgcolor=#d6d6d6
| 441434 ||  || — || March 30, 2008 || Catalina || CSS || — || align=right | 2.9 km || 
|-id=435 bgcolor=#d6d6d6
| 441435 ||  || — || April 3, 2008 || Mount Lemmon || Mount Lemmon Survey || critical || align=right | 2.4 km || 
|-id=436 bgcolor=#d6d6d6
| 441436 ||  || — || April 24, 2008 || Kitt Peak || Spacewatch || LIX || align=right | 3.6 km || 
|-id=437 bgcolor=#d6d6d6
| 441437 ||  || — || April 6, 2008 || Kitt Peak || Spacewatch || — || align=right | 3.8 km || 
|-id=438 bgcolor=#fefefe
| 441438 ||  || — || March 31, 2008 || Mount Lemmon || Mount Lemmon Survey || — || align=right data-sort-value="0.64" | 640 m || 
|-id=439 bgcolor=#d6d6d6
| 441439 ||  || — || March 29, 2008 || Kitt Peak || Spacewatch || EOS || align=right | 1.6 km || 
|-id=440 bgcolor=#d6d6d6
| 441440 ||  || — || April 26, 2008 || Mount Lemmon || Mount Lemmon Survey || — || align=right | 3.3 km || 
|-id=441 bgcolor=#d6d6d6
| 441441 ||  || — || April 27, 2008 || Kitt Peak || Spacewatch || EOS || align=right | 2.0 km || 
|-id=442 bgcolor=#fefefe
| 441442 ||  || — || April 1, 2008 || Kitt Peak || Spacewatch || — || align=right data-sort-value="0.59" | 590 m || 
|-id=443 bgcolor=#fefefe
| 441443 ||  || — || April 28, 2008 || Kitt Peak || Spacewatch || — || align=right data-sort-value="0.65" | 650 m || 
|-id=444 bgcolor=#d6d6d6
| 441444 ||  || — || March 11, 2008 || Mount Lemmon || Mount Lemmon Survey || — || align=right | 2.8 km || 
|-id=445 bgcolor=#fefefe
| 441445 ||  || — || April 29, 2008 || Kitt Peak || Spacewatch || — || align=right data-sort-value="0.63" | 630 m || 
|-id=446 bgcolor=#d6d6d6
| 441446 ||  || — || April 30, 2008 || Kitt Peak || Spacewatch || — || align=right | 2.8 km || 
|-id=447 bgcolor=#fefefe
| 441447 ||  || — || April 29, 2008 || Kitt Peak || Spacewatch || — || align=right data-sort-value="0.61" | 610 m || 
|-id=448 bgcolor=#fefefe
| 441448 ||  || — || April 29, 2008 || Mount Lemmon || Mount Lemmon Survey || — || align=right data-sort-value="0.87" | 870 m || 
|-id=449 bgcolor=#d6d6d6
| 441449 ||  || — || April 28, 2008 || Mount Lemmon || Mount Lemmon Survey || — || align=right | 3.9 km || 
|-id=450 bgcolor=#fefefe
| 441450 ||  || — || May 5, 2008 || Kitt Peak || Spacewatch || — || align=right data-sort-value="0.53" | 530 m || 
|-id=451 bgcolor=#fefefe
| 441451 ||  || — || May 27, 2008 || Kitt Peak || Spacewatch || — || align=right data-sort-value="0.59" | 590 m || 
|-id=452 bgcolor=#d6d6d6
| 441452 ||  || — || May 29, 2008 || Kitt Peak || Spacewatch || — || align=right | 3.2 km || 
|-id=453 bgcolor=#fefefe
| 441453 ||  || — || June 30, 2008 || Kitt Peak || Spacewatch || — || align=right data-sort-value="0.59" | 590 m || 
|-id=454 bgcolor=#fefefe
| 441454 ||  || — || July 27, 2008 || La Sagra || OAM Obs. || — || align=right data-sort-value="0.76" | 760 m || 
|-id=455 bgcolor=#fefefe
| 441455 ||  || — || June 30, 2008 || Socorro || LINEAR || — || align=right | 1.2 km || 
|-id=456 bgcolor=#fefefe
| 441456 ||  || — || July 25, 2008 || Siding Spring || SSS || — || align=right data-sort-value="0.68" | 680 m || 
|-id=457 bgcolor=#fefefe
| 441457 ||  || — || July 30, 2008 || Kitt Peak || Spacewatch || V || align=right data-sort-value="0.50" | 500 m || 
|-id=458 bgcolor=#fefefe
| 441458 ||  || — || October 29, 2005 || Kitt Peak || Spacewatch || BAP || align=right data-sort-value="0.96" | 960 m || 
|-id=459 bgcolor=#fefefe
| 441459 ||  || — || August 7, 2008 || Reedy Creek || J. Broughton || — || align=right data-sort-value="0.75" | 750 m || 
|-id=460 bgcolor=#fefefe
| 441460 ||  || — || July 29, 2008 || Kitt Peak || Spacewatch || — || align=right data-sort-value="0.75" | 750 m || 
|-id=461 bgcolor=#fefefe
| 441461 ||  || — || August 7, 2008 || Kitt Peak || Spacewatch || — || align=right data-sort-value="0.70" | 700 m || 
|-id=462 bgcolor=#fefefe
| 441462 ||  || — || October 23, 2001 || Socorro || LINEAR || — || align=right data-sort-value="0.54" | 540 m || 
|-id=463 bgcolor=#fefefe
| 441463 ||  || — || August 22, 2008 || Kitt Peak || Spacewatch || — || align=right data-sort-value="0.73" | 730 m || 
|-id=464 bgcolor=#fefefe
| 441464 ||  || — || August 26, 2008 || Socorro || LINEAR || — || align=right data-sort-value="0.85" | 850 m || 
|-id=465 bgcolor=#fefefe
| 441465 ||  || — || August 7, 2008 || Kitt Peak || Spacewatch || MAS || align=right data-sort-value="0.62" | 620 m || 
|-id=466 bgcolor=#fefefe
| 441466 ||  || — || August 29, 2008 || La Sagra || OAM Obs. || NYS || align=right data-sort-value="0.70" | 700 m || 
|-id=467 bgcolor=#fefefe
| 441467 ||  || — || August 21, 2008 || Kitt Peak || Spacewatch || — || align=right data-sort-value="0.71" | 710 m || 
|-id=468 bgcolor=#fefefe
| 441468 ||  || — || September 2, 2008 || Kitt Peak || Spacewatch || — || align=right data-sort-value="0.65" | 650 m || 
|-id=469 bgcolor=#fefefe
| 441469 ||  || — || September 3, 2008 || Kitt Peak || Spacewatch || — || align=right data-sort-value="0.65" | 650 m || 
|-id=470 bgcolor=#fefefe
| 441470 ||  || — || September 5, 2008 || Kitt Peak || Spacewatch || — || align=right data-sort-value="0.62" | 620 m || 
|-id=471 bgcolor=#fefefe
| 441471 ||  || — || September 6, 2008 || Catalina || CSS || — || align=right | 1.0 km || 
|-id=472 bgcolor=#fefefe
| 441472 ||  || — || September 5, 2008 || Kitt Peak || Spacewatch || — || align=right data-sort-value="0.90" | 900 m || 
|-id=473 bgcolor=#fefefe
| 441473 ||  || — || September 6, 2008 || Mount Lemmon || Mount Lemmon Survey || NYS || align=right data-sort-value="0.63" | 630 m || 
|-id=474 bgcolor=#fefefe
| 441474 ||  || — || September 6, 2008 || Catalina || CSS || — || align=right data-sort-value="0.90" | 900 m || 
|-id=475 bgcolor=#fefefe
| 441475 ||  || — || September 6, 2008 || Mount Lemmon || Mount Lemmon Survey || — || align=right data-sort-value="0.82" | 820 m || 
|-id=476 bgcolor=#fefefe
| 441476 ||  || — || September 9, 2008 || Mount Lemmon || Mount Lemmon Survey || — || align=right | 1.1 km || 
|-id=477 bgcolor=#fefefe
| 441477 ||  || — || September 10, 2008 || Kitt Peak || Spacewatch || MAS || align=right data-sort-value="0.62" | 620 m || 
|-id=478 bgcolor=#fefefe
| 441478 ||  || — || September 9, 2008 || Mount Lemmon || Mount Lemmon Survey || — || align=right | 1.1 km || 
|-id=479 bgcolor=#fefefe
| 441479 ||  || — || September 9, 2008 || Kitt Peak || Spacewatch || — || align=right | 1.2 km || 
|-id=480 bgcolor=#fefefe
| 441480 ||  || — || September 5, 2008 || Kitt Peak || Spacewatch || — || align=right data-sort-value="0.82" | 820 m || 
|-id=481 bgcolor=#fefefe
| 441481 ||  || — || September 4, 2008 || Kitt Peak || Spacewatch || — || align=right data-sort-value="0.65" | 650 m || 
|-id=482 bgcolor=#fefefe
| 441482 ||  || — || September 4, 2008 || Kitt Peak || Spacewatch || NYS || align=right data-sort-value="0.67" | 670 m || 
|-id=483 bgcolor=#fefefe
| 441483 ||  || — || September 19, 2008 || Kitt Peak || Spacewatch || — || align=right data-sort-value="0.78" | 780 m || 
|-id=484 bgcolor=#fefefe
| 441484 ||  || — || September 19, 2008 || Kitt Peak || Spacewatch || — || align=right data-sort-value="0.71" | 710 m || 
|-id=485 bgcolor=#fefefe
| 441485 ||  || — || September 5, 2008 || Kitt Peak || Spacewatch || — || align=right data-sort-value="0.80" | 800 m || 
|-id=486 bgcolor=#fefefe
| 441486 ||  || — || September 20, 2008 || Kitt Peak || Spacewatch || — || align=right data-sort-value="0.73" | 730 m || 
|-id=487 bgcolor=#fefefe
| 441487 ||  || — || September 20, 2008 || Mount Lemmon || Mount Lemmon Survey || — || align=right data-sort-value="0.65" | 650 m || 
|-id=488 bgcolor=#fefefe
| 441488 ||  || — || September 20, 2008 || Kitt Peak || Spacewatch || — || align=right data-sort-value="0.89" | 890 m || 
|-id=489 bgcolor=#fefefe
| 441489 ||  || — || September 20, 2008 || Kitt Peak || Spacewatch || — || align=right data-sort-value="0.76" | 760 m || 
|-id=490 bgcolor=#fefefe
| 441490 ||  || — || September 21, 2008 || Kitt Peak || Spacewatch || — || align=right data-sort-value="0.80" | 800 m || 
|-id=491 bgcolor=#fefefe
| 441491 ||  || — || September 22, 2008 || Kitt Peak || Spacewatch || — || align=right data-sort-value="0.94" | 940 m || 
|-id=492 bgcolor=#fefefe
| 441492 ||  || — || September 22, 2008 || Kitt Peak || Spacewatch || NYS || align=right data-sort-value="0.70" | 700 m || 
|-id=493 bgcolor=#fefefe
| 441493 ||  || — || September 22, 2008 || Kitt Peak || Spacewatch || — || align=right data-sort-value="0.71" | 710 m || 
|-id=494 bgcolor=#fefefe
| 441494 ||  || — || September 23, 2008 || Mount Lemmon || Mount Lemmon Survey || — || align=right data-sort-value="0.75" | 750 m || 
|-id=495 bgcolor=#fefefe
| 441495 ||  || — || September 23, 2008 || Mount Lemmon || Mount Lemmon Survey || — || align=right data-sort-value="0.71" | 710 m || 
|-id=496 bgcolor=#fefefe
| 441496 ||  || — || September 21, 2008 || Kitt Peak || Spacewatch || — || align=right data-sort-value="0.68" | 680 m || 
|-id=497 bgcolor=#fefefe
| 441497 ||  || — || September 21, 2008 || Kitt Peak || Spacewatch || — || align=right | 1.0 km || 
|-id=498 bgcolor=#fefefe
| 441498 ||  || — || September 21, 2008 || Kitt Peak || Spacewatch || — || align=right data-sort-value="0.69" | 690 m || 
|-id=499 bgcolor=#fefefe
| 441499 ||  || — || September 21, 2008 || Kitt Peak || Spacewatch || — || align=right data-sort-value="0.76" | 760 m || 
|-id=500 bgcolor=#fefefe
| 441500 ||  || — || September 21, 2008 || Kitt Peak || Spacewatch || NYS || align=right data-sort-value="0.58" | 580 m || 
|}

441501–441600 

|-bgcolor=#fefefe
| 441501 ||  || — || September 21, 2008 || Kitt Peak || Spacewatch || NYS || align=right data-sort-value="0.65" | 650 m || 
|-id=502 bgcolor=#fefefe
| 441502 ||  || — || September 7, 2008 || Mount Lemmon || Mount Lemmon Survey || MAS || align=right data-sort-value="0.62" | 620 m || 
|-id=503 bgcolor=#fefefe
| 441503 ||  || — || September 22, 2008 || Mount Lemmon || Mount Lemmon Survey || — || align=right data-sort-value="0.86" | 860 m || 
|-id=504 bgcolor=#fefefe
| 441504 ||  || — || September 22, 2008 || Mount Lemmon || Mount Lemmon Survey || MAS || align=right data-sort-value="0.65" | 650 m || 
|-id=505 bgcolor=#fefefe
| 441505 ||  || — || September 22, 2008 || Mount Lemmon || Mount Lemmon Survey || NYS || align=right data-sort-value="0.72" | 720 m || 
|-id=506 bgcolor=#fefefe
| 441506 ||  || — || September 22, 2008 || Kitt Peak || Spacewatch || — || align=right data-sort-value="0.90" | 900 m || 
|-id=507 bgcolor=#fefefe
| 441507 ||  || — || September 22, 2008 || Kitt Peak || Spacewatch || — || align=right data-sort-value="0.82" | 820 m || 
|-id=508 bgcolor=#fefefe
| 441508 ||  || — || September 22, 2008 || Kitt Peak || Spacewatch || — || align=right data-sort-value="0.65" | 650 m || 
|-id=509 bgcolor=#d6d6d6
| 441509 ||  || — || September 23, 2008 || Kitt Peak || Spacewatch || 3:2 || align=right | 4.8 km || 
|-id=510 bgcolor=#fefefe
| 441510 ||  || — || September 24, 2008 || Catalina || CSS || — || align=right data-sort-value="0.75" | 750 m || 
|-id=511 bgcolor=#fefefe
| 441511 ||  || — || August 24, 2008 || Kitt Peak || Spacewatch || — || align=right data-sort-value="0.97" | 970 m || 
|-id=512 bgcolor=#fefefe
| 441512 ||  || — || September 24, 2008 || Mount Lemmon || Mount Lemmon Survey || MAS || align=right data-sort-value="0.75" | 750 m || 
|-id=513 bgcolor=#fefefe
| 441513 ||  || — || September 23, 2008 || Kitt Peak || Spacewatch || — || align=right data-sort-value="0.82" | 820 m || 
|-id=514 bgcolor=#fefefe
| 441514 ||  || — || September 28, 2008 || Dauban || F. Kugel || — || align=right data-sort-value="0.75" | 750 m || 
|-id=515 bgcolor=#fefefe
| 441515 ||  || — || September 23, 2008 || Catalina || CSS || — || align=right data-sort-value="0.68" | 680 m || 
|-id=516 bgcolor=#fefefe
| 441516 ||  || — || September 24, 2008 || Socorro || LINEAR || — || align=right data-sort-value="0.69" | 690 m || 
|-id=517 bgcolor=#fefefe
| 441517 ||  || — || September 24, 2008 || Socorro || LINEAR || — || align=right data-sort-value="0.71" | 710 m || 
|-id=518 bgcolor=#fefefe
| 441518 ||  || — || September 28, 2008 || Socorro || LINEAR || MAS || align=right data-sort-value="0.80" | 800 m || 
|-id=519 bgcolor=#fefefe
| 441519 ||  || — || September 21, 2008 || Kitt Peak || Spacewatch || — || align=right | 1.0 km || 
|-id=520 bgcolor=#fefefe
| 441520 ||  || — || September 23, 2008 || Kitt Peak || Spacewatch || — || align=right data-sort-value="0.67" | 670 m || 
|-id=521 bgcolor=#fefefe
| 441521 ||  || — || September 24, 2008 || Kitt Peak || Spacewatch || — || align=right data-sort-value="0.58" | 580 m || 
|-id=522 bgcolor=#fefefe
| 441522 ||  || — || September 24, 2008 || Mount Lemmon || Mount Lemmon Survey || — || align=right data-sort-value="0.67" | 670 m || 
|-id=523 bgcolor=#fefefe
| 441523 ||  || — || September 24, 2008 || Mount Lemmon || Mount Lemmon Survey || — || align=right data-sort-value="0.75" | 750 m || 
|-id=524 bgcolor=#fefefe
| 441524 ||  || — || September 24, 2008 || Siding Spring || SSS || — || align=right | 1.4 km || 
|-id=525 bgcolor=#d6d6d6
| 441525 ||  || — || September 30, 2008 || La Sagra || OAM Obs. || 3:2 || align=right | 7.0 km || 
|-id=526 bgcolor=#fefefe
| 441526 ||  || — || September 25, 2008 || Mount Lemmon || Mount Lemmon Survey || — || align=right data-sort-value="0.68" | 680 m || 
|-id=527 bgcolor=#fefefe
| 441527 ||  || — || September 29, 2008 || Kitt Peak || Spacewatch || MAS || align=right data-sort-value="0.58" | 580 m || 
|-id=528 bgcolor=#fefefe
| 441528 ||  || — || September 29, 2008 || Kitt Peak || Spacewatch || NYS || align=right data-sort-value="0.72" | 720 m || 
|-id=529 bgcolor=#fefefe
| 441529 ||  || — || September 21, 2008 || Kitt Peak || Spacewatch || NYS || align=right data-sort-value="0.55" | 550 m || 
|-id=530 bgcolor=#fefefe
| 441530 ||  || — || September 22, 2008 || Kitt Peak || Spacewatch || — || align=right data-sort-value="0.86" | 860 m || 
|-id=531 bgcolor=#FA8072
| 441531 ||  || — || September 29, 2008 || Mount Lemmon || Mount Lemmon Survey || — || align=right data-sort-value="0.75" | 750 m || 
|-id=532 bgcolor=#fefefe
| 441532 ||  || — || September 23, 2008 || Kitt Peak || Spacewatch || — || align=right data-sort-value="0.87" | 870 m || 
|-id=533 bgcolor=#E9E9E9
| 441533 ||  || — || September 23, 2008 || Kitt Peak || Spacewatch || — || align=right | 1.7 km || 
|-id=534 bgcolor=#fefefe
| 441534 ||  || — || September 22, 2008 || Kitt Peak || Spacewatch || — || align=right data-sort-value="0.62" | 620 m || 
|-id=535 bgcolor=#fefefe
| 441535 ||  || — || September 22, 2008 || Kitt Peak || Spacewatch || — || align=right data-sort-value="0.90" | 900 m || 
|-id=536 bgcolor=#fefefe
| 441536 ||  || — || September 29, 2008 || Kitt Peak || Spacewatch || — || align=right data-sort-value="0.76" | 760 m || 
|-id=537 bgcolor=#fefefe
| 441537 ||  || — || September 29, 2008 || Kitt Peak || Spacewatch || MAS || align=right data-sort-value="0.71" | 710 m || 
|-id=538 bgcolor=#fefefe
| 441538 ||  || — || September 29, 2008 || Kitt Peak || Spacewatch || — || align=right data-sort-value="0.76" | 760 m || 
|-id=539 bgcolor=#fefefe
| 441539 ||  || — || September 22, 2008 || Mount Lemmon || Mount Lemmon Survey || MAS || align=right data-sort-value="0.73" | 730 m || 
|-id=540 bgcolor=#fefefe
| 441540 ||  || — || October 1, 2008 || La Sagra || OAM Obs. || NYS || align=right data-sort-value="0.65" | 650 m || 
|-id=541 bgcolor=#fefefe
| 441541 ||  || — || October 1, 2008 || Kitt Peak || Spacewatch || NYS || align=right data-sort-value="0.58" | 580 m || 
|-id=542 bgcolor=#fefefe
| 441542 ||  || — || October 1, 2008 || Mount Lemmon || Mount Lemmon Survey || NYS || align=right data-sort-value="0.50" | 500 m || 
|-id=543 bgcolor=#fefefe
| 441543 ||  || — || September 22, 2008 || Mount Lemmon || Mount Lemmon Survey || — || align=right data-sort-value="0.80" | 800 m || 
|-id=544 bgcolor=#fefefe
| 441544 ||  || — || October 1, 2008 || Kitt Peak || Spacewatch || V || align=right data-sort-value="0.66" | 660 m || 
|-id=545 bgcolor=#fefefe
| 441545 ||  || — || October 1, 2008 || Mount Lemmon || Mount Lemmon Survey || CLA || align=right | 1.3 km || 
|-id=546 bgcolor=#fefefe
| 441546 ||  || — || October 1, 2008 || Mount Lemmon || Mount Lemmon Survey || — || align=right | 1.7 km || 
|-id=547 bgcolor=#fefefe
| 441547 ||  || — || October 1, 2008 || Kitt Peak || Spacewatch || — || align=right data-sort-value="0.96" | 960 m || 
|-id=548 bgcolor=#d6d6d6
| 441548 ||  || — || October 2, 2008 || Kitt Peak || Spacewatch || 3:2 || align=right | 5.1 km || 
|-id=549 bgcolor=#fefefe
| 441549 ||  || — || October 2, 2008 || Kitt Peak || Spacewatch || — || align=right data-sort-value="0.94" | 940 m || 
|-id=550 bgcolor=#d6d6d6
| 441550 ||  || — || September 23, 2008 || Kitt Peak || Spacewatch || 3:2 || align=right | 4.2 km || 
|-id=551 bgcolor=#fefefe
| 441551 ||  || — || October 2, 2008 || Mount Lemmon || Mount Lemmon Survey || — || align=right data-sort-value="0.74" | 740 m || 
|-id=552 bgcolor=#fefefe
| 441552 ||  || — || October 3, 2008 || Kitt Peak || Spacewatch || CLA || align=right | 1.4 km || 
|-id=553 bgcolor=#fefefe
| 441553 ||  || — || October 3, 2008 || Kitt Peak || Spacewatch || V || align=right data-sort-value="0.60" | 600 m || 
|-id=554 bgcolor=#fefefe
| 441554 ||  || — || October 7, 2008 || Mount Lemmon || Mount Lemmon Survey || — || align=right data-sort-value="0.75" | 750 m || 
|-id=555 bgcolor=#fefefe
| 441555 ||  || — || October 8, 2008 || Mount Lemmon || Mount Lemmon Survey || — || align=right data-sort-value="0.94" | 940 m || 
|-id=556 bgcolor=#fefefe
| 441556 ||  || — || October 8, 2008 || Kitt Peak || Spacewatch || — || align=right data-sort-value="0.75" | 750 m || 
|-id=557 bgcolor=#fefefe
| 441557 ||  || — || September 23, 2008 || Kitt Peak || Spacewatch || — || align=right | 1.2 km || 
|-id=558 bgcolor=#fefefe
| 441558 ||  || — || September 23, 2008 || Catalina || CSS || — || align=right data-sort-value="0.93" | 930 m || 
|-id=559 bgcolor=#fefefe
| 441559 ||  || — || October 8, 2008 || Mount Lemmon || Mount Lemmon Survey || — || align=right data-sort-value="0.79" | 790 m || 
|-id=560 bgcolor=#fefefe
| 441560 ||  || — || October 10, 2008 || Kitt Peak || Spacewatch || — || align=right data-sort-value="0.60" | 600 m || 
|-id=561 bgcolor=#fefefe
| 441561 ||  || — || October 9, 2008 || Catalina || CSS || — || align=right data-sort-value="0.83" | 830 m || 
|-id=562 bgcolor=#E9E9E9
| 441562 ||  || — || October 9, 2008 || Kitt Peak || Spacewatch || — || align=right data-sort-value="0.98" | 980 m || 
|-id=563 bgcolor=#d6d6d6
| 441563 Domanski || 2008 UK ||  || October 19, 2008 || Antares || B. Sobczuk || 3:2 || align=right | 5.0 km || 
|-id=564 bgcolor=#d6d6d6
| 441564 ||  || — || October 26, 2008 || Bisei SG Center || BATTeRS || Tj (2.95) || align=right | 4.0 km || 
|-id=565 bgcolor=#fefefe
| 441565 ||  || — || September 7, 2008 || Mount Lemmon || Mount Lemmon Survey || NYS || align=right data-sort-value="0.58" | 580 m || 
|-id=566 bgcolor=#fefefe
| 441566 ||  || — || October 20, 2008 || Kitt Peak || Spacewatch || — || align=right data-sort-value="0.68" | 680 m || 
|-id=567 bgcolor=#fefefe
| 441567 ||  || — || October 20, 2008 || Kitt Peak || Spacewatch || — || align=right data-sort-value="0.98" | 980 m || 
|-id=568 bgcolor=#fefefe
| 441568 ||  || — || October 20, 2008 || Kitt Peak || Spacewatch || NYS || align=right data-sort-value="0.79" | 790 m || 
|-id=569 bgcolor=#fefefe
| 441569 ||  || — || October 20, 2008 || Kitt Peak || Spacewatch || — || align=right data-sort-value="0.98" | 980 m || 
|-id=570 bgcolor=#fefefe
| 441570 ||  || — || September 6, 2008 || Mount Lemmon || Mount Lemmon Survey || V || align=right data-sort-value="0.66" | 660 m || 
|-id=571 bgcolor=#fefefe
| 441571 ||  || — || October 20, 2008 || Kitt Peak || Spacewatch || SUL || align=right | 1.8 km || 
|-id=572 bgcolor=#fefefe
| 441572 ||  || — || October 20, 2008 || Kitt Peak || Spacewatch || NYS || align=right data-sort-value="0.58" | 580 m || 
|-id=573 bgcolor=#fefefe
| 441573 ||  || — || October 20, 2008 || Mount Lemmon || Mount Lemmon Survey || NYS || align=right data-sort-value="0.63" | 630 m || 
|-id=574 bgcolor=#fefefe
| 441574 ||  || — || October 20, 2008 || Kitt Peak || Spacewatch || — || align=right data-sort-value="0.68" | 680 m || 
|-id=575 bgcolor=#fefefe
| 441575 ||  || — || October 20, 2008 || Mount Lemmon || Mount Lemmon Survey || — || align=right data-sort-value="0.73" | 730 m || 
|-id=576 bgcolor=#fefefe
| 441576 ||  || — || October 20, 2008 || Kitt Peak || Spacewatch || — || align=right data-sort-value="0.72" | 720 m || 
|-id=577 bgcolor=#fefefe
| 441577 ||  || — || October 21, 2008 || Kitt Peak || Spacewatch || — || align=right data-sort-value="0.80" | 800 m || 
|-id=578 bgcolor=#E9E9E9
| 441578 ||  || — || October 21, 2008 || Kitt Peak || Spacewatch || EUN || align=right | 1.3 km || 
|-id=579 bgcolor=#fefefe
| 441579 ||  || — || October 21, 2008 || Kitt Peak || Spacewatch || — || align=right data-sort-value="0.80" | 800 m || 
|-id=580 bgcolor=#fefefe
| 441580 ||  || — || October 22, 2008 || Kitt Peak || Spacewatch || — || align=right data-sort-value="0.75" | 750 m || 
|-id=581 bgcolor=#E9E9E9
| 441581 ||  || — || September 25, 2008 || Mount Lemmon || Mount Lemmon Survey || — || align=right | 1.4 km || 
|-id=582 bgcolor=#fefefe
| 441582 ||  || — || October 24, 2008 || Mount Lemmon || Mount Lemmon Survey || — || align=right data-sort-value="0.79" | 790 m || 
|-id=583 bgcolor=#fefefe
| 441583 ||  || — || October 24, 2008 || Socorro || LINEAR || V || align=right data-sort-value="0.72" | 720 m || 
|-id=584 bgcolor=#fefefe
| 441584 ||  || — || October 1, 2008 || Kitt Peak || Spacewatch || — || align=right | 1.1 km || 
|-id=585 bgcolor=#E9E9E9
| 441585 ||  || — || October 26, 2008 || Socorro || LINEAR || (5) || align=right | 1.2 km || 
|-id=586 bgcolor=#fefefe
| 441586 ||  || — || October 27, 2008 || Socorro || LINEAR || — || align=right | 1.2 km || 
|-id=587 bgcolor=#fefefe
| 441587 ||  || — || October 22, 2008 || Kitt Peak || Spacewatch || — || align=right data-sort-value="0.84" | 840 m || 
|-id=588 bgcolor=#fefefe
| 441588 ||  || — || October 22, 2008 || Kitt Peak || Spacewatch || — || align=right data-sort-value="0.72" | 720 m || 
|-id=589 bgcolor=#fefefe
| 441589 ||  || — || October 22, 2008 || Kitt Peak || Spacewatch || — || align=right data-sort-value="0.75" | 750 m || 
|-id=590 bgcolor=#fefefe
| 441590 ||  || — || October 22, 2008 || Kitt Peak || Spacewatch || — || align=right data-sort-value="0.86" | 860 m || 
|-id=591 bgcolor=#fefefe
| 441591 ||  || — || October 22, 2008 || Kitt Peak || Spacewatch || — || align=right data-sort-value="0.72" | 720 m || 
|-id=592 bgcolor=#E9E9E9
| 441592 ||  || — || October 22, 2008 || Kitt Peak || Spacewatch || — || align=right | 1.6 km || 
|-id=593 bgcolor=#E9E9E9
| 441593 ||  || — || October 23, 2008 || Mount Lemmon || Mount Lemmon Survey || — || align=right data-sort-value="0.91" | 910 m || 
|-id=594 bgcolor=#E9E9E9
| 441594 ||  || — || October 24, 2008 || Kitt Peak || Spacewatch || — || align=right | 1.1 km || 
|-id=595 bgcolor=#fefefe
| 441595 ||  || — || October 24, 2008 || Mount Lemmon || Mount Lemmon Survey || NYS || align=right data-sort-value="0.64" | 640 m || 
|-id=596 bgcolor=#fefefe
| 441596 ||  || — || October 24, 2008 || Mount Lemmon || Mount Lemmon Survey || — || align=right data-sort-value="0.94" | 940 m || 
|-id=597 bgcolor=#d6d6d6
| 441597 ||  || — || October 24, 2008 || Kitt Peak || Spacewatch || 3:2 || align=right | 3.9 km || 
|-id=598 bgcolor=#fefefe
| 441598 ||  || — || October 20, 2008 || Mount Lemmon || Mount Lemmon Survey || — || align=right | 2.1 km || 
|-id=599 bgcolor=#fefefe
| 441599 ||  || — || September 24, 2008 || Mount Lemmon || Mount Lemmon Survey || — || align=right data-sort-value="0.75" | 750 m || 
|-id=600 bgcolor=#FA8072
| 441600 ||  || — || October 28, 2008 || Socorro || LINEAR || — || align=right data-sort-value="0.86" | 860 m || 
|}

441601–441700 

|-bgcolor=#fefefe
| 441601 ||  || — || September 22, 2008 || Mount Lemmon || Mount Lemmon Survey || V || align=right data-sort-value="0.65" | 650 m || 
|-id=602 bgcolor=#fefefe
| 441602 ||  || — || October 24, 2008 || Catalina || CSS || — || align=right data-sort-value="0.81" | 810 m || 
|-id=603 bgcolor=#fefefe
| 441603 ||  || — || October 25, 2008 || Kitt Peak || Spacewatch || NYS || align=right data-sort-value="0.70" | 700 m || 
|-id=604 bgcolor=#fefefe
| 441604 ||  || — || October 26, 2008 || Kitt Peak || Spacewatch || — || align=right data-sort-value="0.82" | 820 m || 
|-id=605 bgcolor=#fefefe
| 441605 ||  || — || May 24, 2007 || Mount Lemmon || Mount Lemmon Survey || — || align=right data-sort-value="0.85" | 850 m || 
|-id=606 bgcolor=#fefefe
| 441606 ||  || — || October 26, 2008 || Kitt Peak || Spacewatch || V || align=right data-sort-value="0.69" | 690 m || 
|-id=607 bgcolor=#d6d6d6
| 441607 ||  || — || October 26, 2008 || Kitt Peak || Spacewatch || HIL3:2 || align=right | 5.0 km || 
|-id=608 bgcolor=#fefefe
| 441608 ||  || — || October 28, 2008 || Kitt Peak || Spacewatch || NYS || align=right data-sort-value="0.55" | 550 m || 
|-id=609 bgcolor=#fefefe
| 441609 ||  || — || October 20, 2008 || Kitt Peak || Spacewatch || V || align=right data-sort-value="0.69" | 690 m || 
|-id=610 bgcolor=#fefefe
| 441610 ||  || — || October 28, 2008 || Kitt Peak || Spacewatch || — || align=right data-sort-value="0.72" | 720 m || 
|-id=611 bgcolor=#fefefe
| 441611 ||  || — || October 9, 2008 || Kitt Peak || Spacewatch || — || align=right | 1.0 km || 
|-id=612 bgcolor=#fefefe
| 441612 ||  || — || September 9, 2008 || Kitt Peak || Spacewatch || V || align=right data-sort-value="0.64" | 640 m || 
|-id=613 bgcolor=#fefefe
| 441613 ||  || — || September 29, 2008 || Catalina || CSS || — || align=right data-sort-value="0.80" | 800 m || 
|-id=614 bgcolor=#fefefe
| 441614 ||  || — || October 30, 2008 || Catalina || CSS || — || align=right data-sort-value="0.97" | 970 m || 
|-id=615 bgcolor=#fefefe
| 441615 ||  || — || October 30, 2008 || Kitt Peak || Spacewatch || — || align=right data-sort-value="0.71" | 710 m || 
|-id=616 bgcolor=#fefefe
| 441616 ||  || — || October 30, 2008 || Kitt Peak || Spacewatch || MAS || align=right data-sort-value="0.63" | 630 m || 
|-id=617 bgcolor=#fefefe
| 441617 ||  || — || September 25, 2008 || Mount Lemmon || Mount Lemmon Survey || — || align=right data-sort-value="0.71" | 710 m || 
|-id=618 bgcolor=#fefefe
| 441618 ||  || — || October 31, 2008 || Catalina || CSS || — || align=right data-sort-value="0.90" | 900 m || 
|-id=619 bgcolor=#fefefe
| 441619 ||  || — || October 29, 2008 || Kitt Peak || Spacewatch || — || align=right data-sort-value="0.76" | 760 m || 
|-id=620 bgcolor=#E9E9E9
| 441620 ||  || — || October 31, 2008 || Mount Lemmon || Mount Lemmon Survey || — || align=right | 1.7 km || 
|-id=621 bgcolor=#fefefe
| 441621 ||  || — || October 22, 2008 || Mount Lemmon || Mount Lemmon Survey || — || align=right data-sort-value="0.86" | 860 m || 
|-id=622 bgcolor=#FA8072
| 441622 ||  || — || October 20, 2008 || Mount Lemmon || Mount Lemmon Survey || — || align=right data-sort-value="0.86" | 860 m || 
|-id=623 bgcolor=#fefefe
| 441623 ||  || — || October 29, 2008 || Kitt Peak || Spacewatch || — || align=right data-sort-value="0.84" | 840 m || 
|-id=624 bgcolor=#E9E9E9
| 441624 ||  || — || November 1, 2008 || Socorro || LINEAR || — || align=right | 4.7 km || 
|-id=625 bgcolor=#fefefe
| 441625 ||  || — || October 31, 2008 || Catalina || CSS || — || align=right data-sort-value="0.95" | 950 m || 
|-id=626 bgcolor=#fefefe
| 441626 ||  || — || November 2, 2008 || Mount Lemmon || Mount Lemmon Survey || — || align=right data-sort-value="0.86" | 860 m || 
|-id=627 bgcolor=#fefefe
| 441627 ||  || — || November 1, 2008 || Kitt Peak || Spacewatch || — || align=right data-sort-value="0.98" | 980 m || 
|-id=628 bgcolor=#fefefe
| 441628 ||  || — || November 1, 2008 || Kitt Peak || Spacewatch || (5026) || align=right data-sort-value="0.90" | 900 m || 
|-id=629 bgcolor=#fefefe
| 441629 ||  || — || November 2, 2008 || Mount Lemmon || Mount Lemmon Survey || — || align=right data-sort-value="0.72" | 720 m || 
|-id=630 bgcolor=#fefefe
| 441630 ||  || — || November 3, 2008 || Mount Lemmon || Mount Lemmon Survey || NYS || align=right data-sort-value="0.55" | 550 m || 
|-id=631 bgcolor=#fefefe
| 441631 ||  || — || November 4, 2008 || Kitt Peak || Spacewatch || NYS || align=right data-sort-value="0.63" | 630 m || 
|-id=632 bgcolor=#fefefe
| 441632 ||  || — || November 7, 2008 || Mount Lemmon || Mount Lemmon Survey || — || align=right data-sort-value="0.86" | 860 m || 
|-id=633 bgcolor=#fefefe
| 441633 ||  || — || November 5, 2008 || Siding Spring || SSS || — || align=right data-sort-value="0.89" | 890 m || 
|-id=634 bgcolor=#E9E9E9
| 441634 ||  || — || November 8, 2008 || Mount Lemmon || Mount Lemmon Survey || — || align=right | 1.2 km || 
|-id=635 bgcolor=#fefefe
| 441635 ||  || — || November 1, 2008 || Mount Lemmon || Mount Lemmon Survey || — || align=right data-sort-value="0.90" | 900 m || 
|-id=636 bgcolor=#fefefe
| 441636 ||  || — || November 1, 2008 || Mount Lemmon || Mount Lemmon Survey || — || align=right data-sort-value="0.85" | 850 m || 
|-id=637 bgcolor=#fefefe
| 441637 ||  || — || November 2, 2008 || Mount Lemmon || Mount Lemmon Survey || — || align=right data-sort-value="0.79" | 790 m || 
|-id=638 bgcolor=#fefefe
| 441638 ||  || — || November 7, 2008 || Mount Lemmon || Mount Lemmon Survey || — || align=right data-sort-value="0.71" | 710 m || 
|-id=639 bgcolor=#fefefe
| 441639 ||  || — || November 7, 2008 || Mount Lemmon || Mount Lemmon Survey || NYS || align=right data-sort-value="0.56" | 560 m || 
|-id=640 bgcolor=#fefefe
| 441640 ||  || — || November 7, 2008 || Mount Lemmon || Mount Lemmon Survey || — || align=right | 1.2 km || 
|-id=641 bgcolor=#FFC2E0
| 441641 ||  || — || November 20, 2008 || Mount Lemmon || Mount Lemmon Survey || APOPHA || align=right data-sort-value="0.68" | 680 m || 
|-id=642 bgcolor=#fefefe
| 441642 ||  || — || November 18, 2008 || Kitt Peak || Spacewatch || MAS || align=right data-sort-value="0.74" | 740 m || 
|-id=643 bgcolor=#fefefe
| 441643 ||  || — || September 22, 2008 || Mount Lemmon || Mount Lemmon Survey || NYS || align=right data-sort-value="0.66" | 660 m || 
|-id=644 bgcolor=#fefefe
| 441644 ||  || — || October 24, 2008 || Kitt Peak || Spacewatch || — || align=right data-sort-value="0.90" | 900 m || 
|-id=645 bgcolor=#fefefe
| 441645 ||  || — || November 19, 2008 || Mount Lemmon || Mount Lemmon Survey || NYS || align=right data-sort-value="0.69" | 690 m || 
|-id=646 bgcolor=#E9E9E9
| 441646 ||  || — || March 2, 2006 || Kitt Peak || Spacewatch || (5) || align=right data-sort-value="0.90" | 900 m || 
|-id=647 bgcolor=#fefefe
| 441647 ||  || — || November 17, 2008 || Kitt Peak || Spacewatch || — || align=right data-sort-value="0.78" | 780 m || 
|-id=648 bgcolor=#fefefe
| 441648 ||  || — || November 17, 2008 || Kitt Peak || Spacewatch || — || align=right data-sort-value="0.91" | 910 m || 
|-id=649 bgcolor=#fefefe
| 441649 ||  || — || November 3, 2004 || Kitt Peak || Spacewatch || — || align=right data-sort-value="0.75" | 750 m || 
|-id=650 bgcolor=#fefefe
| 441650 ||  || — || November 18, 2008 || Catalina || CSS || NYS || align=right data-sort-value="0.72" | 720 m || 
|-id=651 bgcolor=#fefefe
| 441651 ||  || — || November 18, 2008 || Kitt Peak || Spacewatch || — || align=right data-sort-value="0.60" | 600 m || 
|-id=652 bgcolor=#fefefe
| 441652 ||  || — || September 28, 2008 || Mount Lemmon || Mount Lemmon Survey || — || align=right data-sort-value="0.75" | 750 m || 
|-id=653 bgcolor=#fefefe
| 441653 ||  || — || November 19, 2008 || Mount Lemmon || Mount Lemmon Survey || — || align=right data-sort-value="0.87" | 870 m || 
|-id=654 bgcolor=#fefefe
| 441654 ||  || — || November 20, 2008 || Kitt Peak || Spacewatch || — || align=right data-sort-value="0.78" | 780 m || 
|-id=655 bgcolor=#E9E9E9
| 441655 ||  || — || October 1, 2008 || Mount Lemmon || Mount Lemmon Survey || — || align=right data-sort-value="0.87" | 870 m || 
|-id=656 bgcolor=#fefefe
| 441656 ||  || — || April 22, 2007 || Kitt Peak || Spacewatch || — || align=right data-sort-value="0.82" | 820 m || 
|-id=657 bgcolor=#fefefe
| 441657 ||  || — || November 22, 2008 || Kitt Peak || Spacewatch || — || align=right data-sort-value="0.75" | 750 m || 
|-id=658 bgcolor=#E9E9E9
| 441658 ||  || — || November 8, 2008 || Mount Lemmon || Mount Lemmon Survey || — || align=right | 1.9 km || 
|-id=659 bgcolor=#fefefe
| 441659 ||  || — || November 23, 2008 || Socorro || LINEAR || H || align=right data-sort-value="0.82" | 820 m || 
|-id=660 bgcolor=#fefefe
| 441660 ||  || — || November 30, 2008 || Catalina || CSS || — || align=right | 1.0 km || 
|-id=661 bgcolor=#fefefe
| 441661 ||  || — || November 30, 2008 || Kitt Peak || Spacewatch || NYS || align=right data-sort-value="0.71" | 710 m || 
|-id=662 bgcolor=#E9E9E9
| 441662 ||  || — || November 21, 2008 || Kitt Peak || Spacewatch || — || align=right | 3.6 km || 
|-id=663 bgcolor=#E9E9E9
| 441663 ||  || — || November 21, 2008 || Mount Lemmon || Mount Lemmon Survey || — || align=right | 1.8 km || 
|-id=664 bgcolor=#E9E9E9
| 441664 ||  || — || November 30, 2008 || Socorro || LINEAR || EUN || align=right | 1.7 km || 
|-id=665 bgcolor=#fefefe
| 441665 ||  || — || November 18, 2008 || Kitt Peak || Spacewatch || MAS || align=right data-sort-value="0.78" | 780 m || 
|-id=666 bgcolor=#fefefe
| 441666 ||  || — || November 24, 2008 || Kitt Peak || Spacewatch || — || align=right data-sort-value="0.86" | 860 m || 
|-id=667 bgcolor=#d6d6d6
| 441667 ||  || — || November 19, 2008 || Mount Lemmon || Mount Lemmon Survey || SHU3:2 || align=right | 5.3 km || 
|-id=668 bgcolor=#E9E9E9
| 441668 ||  || — || December 1, 2008 || Catalina || CSS || — || align=right | 2.2 km || 
|-id=669 bgcolor=#fefefe
| 441669 ||  || — || December 1, 2008 || Kitt Peak || Spacewatch || — || align=right data-sort-value="0.57" | 570 m || 
|-id=670 bgcolor=#fefefe
| 441670 ||  || — || December 2, 2008 || Kitt Peak || Spacewatch || NYS || align=right data-sort-value="0.52" | 520 m || 
|-id=671 bgcolor=#fefefe
| 441671 ||  || — || November 20, 2008 || Kitt Peak || Spacewatch || — || align=right | 1.0 km || 
|-id=672 bgcolor=#E9E9E9
| 441672 ||  || — || December 2, 2008 || Kitt Peak || Spacewatch || — || align=right data-sort-value="0.83" | 830 m || 
|-id=673 bgcolor=#E9E9E9
| 441673 ||  || — || November 23, 2008 || Mount Lemmon || Mount Lemmon Survey || RAF || align=right data-sort-value="0.90" | 900 m || 
|-id=674 bgcolor=#fefefe
| 441674 ||  || — || December 4, 2008 || Mount Lemmon || Mount Lemmon Survey || — || align=right data-sort-value="0.74" | 740 m || 
|-id=675 bgcolor=#fefefe
| 441675 ||  || — || December 2, 2008 || Mount Lemmon || Mount Lemmon Survey || — || align=right | 1.1 km || 
|-id=676 bgcolor=#fefefe
| 441676 ||  || — || December 21, 2008 || San Marcello || Pistoia Mountains Obs. || — || align=right data-sort-value="0.80" | 800 m || 
|-id=677 bgcolor=#fefefe
| 441677 ||  || — || December 3, 2008 || Mount Lemmon || Mount Lemmon Survey || — || align=right data-sort-value="0.75" | 750 m || 
|-id=678 bgcolor=#fefefe
| 441678 ||  || — || December 4, 2008 || Mount Lemmon || Mount Lemmon Survey || V || align=right data-sort-value="0.57" | 570 m || 
|-id=679 bgcolor=#E9E9E9
| 441679 ||  || — || December 21, 2008 || Mount Lemmon || Mount Lemmon Survey || — || align=right data-sort-value="0.85" | 850 m || 
|-id=680 bgcolor=#E9E9E9
| 441680 ||  || — || November 8, 2008 || Mount Lemmon || Mount Lemmon Survey || — || align=right | 1.1 km || 
|-id=681 bgcolor=#fefefe
| 441681 ||  || — || November 7, 2008 || Mount Lemmon || Mount Lemmon Survey || — || align=right data-sort-value="0.71" | 710 m || 
|-id=682 bgcolor=#E9E9E9
| 441682 ||  || — || December 29, 2008 || Mount Lemmon || Mount Lemmon Survey || — || align=right data-sort-value="0.98" | 980 m || 
|-id=683 bgcolor=#fefefe
| 441683 ||  || — || December 21, 2008 || Kitt Peak || Spacewatch || — || align=right data-sort-value="0.94" | 940 m || 
|-id=684 bgcolor=#E9E9E9
| 441684 ||  || — || December 29, 2008 || Mount Lemmon || Mount Lemmon Survey || — || align=right data-sort-value="0.72" | 720 m || 
|-id=685 bgcolor=#fefefe
| 441685 ||  || — || December 21, 2008 || Mount Lemmon || Mount Lemmon Survey || — || align=right data-sort-value="0.79" | 790 m || 
|-id=686 bgcolor=#E9E9E9
| 441686 ||  || — || December 21, 2008 || Kitt Peak || Spacewatch || — || align=right | 1.6 km || 
|-id=687 bgcolor=#E9E9E9
| 441687 ||  || — || December 29, 2008 || Mount Lemmon || Mount Lemmon Survey || — || align=right | 2.1 km || 
|-id=688 bgcolor=#E9E9E9
| 441688 ||  || — || December 29, 2008 || Kitt Peak || Spacewatch || — || align=right data-sort-value="0.90" | 900 m || 
|-id=689 bgcolor=#E9E9E9
| 441689 ||  || — || May 24, 2006 || Kitt Peak || Spacewatch || MAR || align=right data-sort-value="0.92" | 920 m || 
|-id=690 bgcolor=#fefefe
| 441690 ||  || — || December 21, 2008 || Mount Lemmon || Mount Lemmon Survey || — || align=right data-sort-value="0.73" | 730 m || 
|-id=691 bgcolor=#E9E9E9
| 441691 ||  || — || December 29, 2008 || Kitt Peak || Spacewatch || — || align=right | 2.3 km || 
|-id=692 bgcolor=#E9E9E9
| 441692 ||  || — || December 21, 2008 || Kitt Peak || Spacewatch || — || align=right data-sort-value="0.86" | 860 m || 
|-id=693 bgcolor=#E9E9E9
| 441693 ||  || — || December 30, 2008 || Kitt Peak || Spacewatch || — || align=right data-sort-value="0.84" | 840 m || 
|-id=694 bgcolor=#fefefe
| 441694 ||  || — || December 22, 2008 || Kitt Peak || Spacewatch || — || align=right data-sort-value="0.87" | 870 m || 
|-id=695 bgcolor=#fefefe
| 441695 ||  || — || November 30, 2008 || Mount Lemmon || Mount Lemmon Survey || — || align=right data-sort-value="0.90" | 900 m || 
|-id=696 bgcolor=#fefefe
| 441696 ||  || — || December 30, 2008 || Kitt Peak || Spacewatch || — || align=right data-sort-value="0.86" | 860 m || 
|-id=697 bgcolor=#fefefe
| 441697 ||  || — || November 24, 2008 || Mount Lemmon || Mount Lemmon Survey || H || align=right data-sort-value="0.71" | 710 m || 
|-id=698 bgcolor=#d6d6d6
| 441698 ||  || — || December 30, 2008 || Mount Lemmon || Mount Lemmon Survey || — || align=right | 2.4 km || 
|-id=699 bgcolor=#E9E9E9
| 441699 ||  || — || December 21, 2008 || Mount Lemmon || Mount Lemmon Survey || — || align=right data-sort-value="0.79" | 790 m || 
|-id=700 bgcolor=#E9E9E9
| 441700 ||  || — || December 31, 2008 || Mount Lemmon || Mount Lemmon Survey || — || align=right data-sort-value="0.66" | 660 m || 
|}

441701–441800 

|-bgcolor=#fefefe
| 441701 ||  || — || December 28, 2008 || Socorro || LINEAR || H || align=right data-sort-value="0.71" | 710 m || 
|-id=702 bgcolor=#E9E9E9
| 441702 ||  || — || January 1, 2009 || Bisei SG Center || BATTeRS || (5) || align=right data-sort-value="0.70" | 700 m || 
|-id=703 bgcolor=#E9E9E9
| 441703 ||  || — || November 21, 2008 || Mount Lemmon || Mount Lemmon Survey || — || align=right | 1.8 km || 
|-id=704 bgcolor=#fefefe
| 441704 ||  || — || December 2, 2008 || Mount Lemmon || Mount Lemmon Survey || — || align=right data-sort-value="0.93" | 930 m || 
|-id=705 bgcolor=#E9E9E9
| 441705 ||  || — || January 2, 2009 || Mount Lemmon || Mount Lemmon Survey || — || align=right data-sort-value="0.85" | 850 m || 
|-id=706 bgcolor=#E9E9E9
| 441706 ||  || — || January 15, 2009 || Kitt Peak || Spacewatch || — || align=right | 1.3 km || 
|-id=707 bgcolor=#fefefe
| 441707 ||  || — || November 24, 2008 || Mount Lemmon || Mount Lemmon Survey || — || align=right data-sort-value="0.86" | 860 m || 
|-id=708 bgcolor=#E9E9E9
| 441708 ||  || — || January 2, 2009 || Kitt Peak || Spacewatch || — || align=right | 2.0 km || 
|-id=709 bgcolor=#E9E9E9
| 441709 ||  || — || January 1, 2009 || Kitt Peak || Spacewatch || (5) || align=right data-sort-value="0.61" | 610 m || 
|-id=710 bgcolor=#E9E9E9
| 441710 ||  || — || January 7, 2009 || Kitt Peak || Spacewatch || — || align=right | 2.0 km || 
|-id=711 bgcolor=#fefefe
| 441711 ||  || — || December 21, 2008 || Catalina || CSS || — || align=right data-sort-value="0.98" | 980 m || 
|-id=712 bgcolor=#E9E9E9
| 441712 ||  || — || December 5, 2008 || Mount Lemmon || Mount Lemmon Survey || — || align=right | 1.5 km || 
|-id=713 bgcolor=#E9E9E9
| 441713 ||  || — || January 16, 2009 || Needville || J. Dellinger || — || align=right | 2.3 km || 
|-id=714 bgcolor=#E9E9E9
| 441714 ||  || — || November 21, 2008 || Mount Lemmon || Mount Lemmon Survey || — || align=right | 1.1 km || 
|-id=715 bgcolor=#E9E9E9
| 441715 ||  || — || October 2, 2008 || Mount Lemmon || Mount Lemmon Survey || — || align=right | 2.1 km || 
|-id=716 bgcolor=#E9E9E9
| 441716 ||  || — || January 16, 2009 || Kitt Peak || Spacewatch || EUN || align=right | 1.2 km || 
|-id=717 bgcolor=#fefefe
| 441717 ||  || — || December 29, 2008 || Kitt Peak || Spacewatch || H || align=right data-sort-value="0.68" | 680 m || 
|-id=718 bgcolor=#E9E9E9
| 441718 ||  || — || January 16, 2009 || Kitt Peak || Spacewatch || — || align=right | 1.4 km || 
|-id=719 bgcolor=#E9E9E9
| 441719 ||  || — || January 16, 2009 || Kitt Peak || Spacewatch || — || align=right | 1.3 km || 
|-id=720 bgcolor=#E9E9E9
| 441720 ||  || — || January 16, 2009 || Kitt Peak || Spacewatch || — || align=right | 1.2 km || 
|-id=721 bgcolor=#E9E9E9
| 441721 ||  || — || January 16, 2009 || Kitt Peak || Spacewatch || — || align=right data-sort-value="0.77" | 770 m || 
|-id=722 bgcolor=#E9E9E9
| 441722 ||  || — || January 16, 2009 || Mount Lemmon || Mount Lemmon Survey || — || align=right | 1.3 km || 
|-id=723 bgcolor=#E9E9E9
| 441723 ||  || — || January 2, 2009 || Mount Lemmon || Mount Lemmon Survey || — || align=right | 1.4 km || 
|-id=724 bgcolor=#E9E9E9
| 441724 ||  || — || January 16, 2009 || Mount Lemmon || Mount Lemmon Survey || — || align=right data-sort-value="0.98" | 980 m || 
|-id=725 bgcolor=#E9E9E9
| 441725 ||  || — || January 2, 2009 || Mount Lemmon || Mount Lemmon Survey || — || align=right | 1.5 km || 
|-id=726 bgcolor=#E9E9E9
| 441726 ||  || — || January 16, 2009 || Mount Lemmon || Mount Lemmon Survey || — || align=right | 1.4 km || 
|-id=727 bgcolor=#E9E9E9
| 441727 ||  || — || January 16, 2009 || Mount Lemmon || Mount Lemmon Survey || — || align=right | 1.9 km || 
|-id=728 bgcolor=#E9E9E9
| 441728 ||  || — || December 4, 2008 || Mount Lemmon || Mount Lemmon Survey || EUN || align=right | 1.3 km || 
|-id=729 bgcolor=#E9E9E9
| 441729 ||  || — || January 20, 2009 || Kitt Peak || Spacewatch || — || align=right | 1.5 km || 
|-id=730 bgcolor=#fefefe
| 441730 ||  || — || January 1, 2009 || Kitt Peak || Spacewatch || — || align=right | 1.1 km || 
|-id=731 bgcolor=#E9E9E9
| 441731 ||  || — || January 25, 2009 || Catalina || CSS || EUN || align=right data-sort-value="0.94" | 940 m || 
|-id=732 bgcolor=#E9E9E9
| 441732 ||  || — || December 1, 2008 || Mount Lemmon || Mount Lemmon Survey || — || align=right | 1.2 km || 
|-id=733 bgcolor=#fefefe
| 441733 ||  || — || January 25, 2009 || Socorro || LINEAR || H || align=right data-sort-value="0.88" | 880 m || 
|-id=734 bgcolor=#E9E9E9
| 441734 ||  || — || December 29, 2008 || Mount Lemmon || Mount Lemmon Survey || EUN || align=right | 1.3 km || 
|-id=735 bgcolor=#E9E9E9
| 441735 ||  || — || January 25, 2009 || Kitt Peak || Spacewatch || — || align=right | 1.9 km || 
|-id=736 bgcolor=#E9E9E9
| 441736 ||  || — || January 15, 2009 || Kitt Peak || Spacewatch || — || align=right | 1.5 km || 
|-id=737 bgcolor=#E9E9E9
| 441737 ||  || — || January 26, 2009 || Purple Mountain || PMO NEO || — || align=right | 2.3 km || 
|-id=738 bgcolor=#fefefe
| 441738 ||  || — || January 29, 2009 || Mount Lemmon || Mount Lemmon Survey || H || align=right data-sort-value="0.73" | 730 m || 
|-id=739 bgcolor=#d6d6d6
| 441739 ||  || — || January 25, 2009 || Kitt Peak || Spacewatch || — || align=right | 2.1 km || 
|-id=740 bgcolor=#E9E9E9
| 441740 ||  || — || January 18, 2009 || Kitt Peak || Spacewatch || — || align=right data-sort-value="0.89" | 890 m || 
|-id=741 bgcolor=#E9E9E9
| 441741 ||  || — || January 31, 2009 || Mount Lemmon || Mount Lemmon Survey || — || align=right | 1.7 km || 
|-id=742 bgcolor=#E9E9E9
| 441742 ||  || — || January 29, 2009 || Kitt Peak || Spacewatch || — || align=right data-sort-value="0.73" | 730 m || 
|-id=743 bgcolor=#E9E9E9
| 441743 ||  || — || January 2, 2009 || Mount Lemmon || Mount Lemmon Survey || — || align=right | 1.5 km || 
|-id=744 bgcolor=#E9E9E9
| 441744 ||  || — || January 29, 2009 || Kitt Peak || Spacewatch || — || align=right | 2.4 km || 
|-id=745 bgcolor=#E9E9E9
| 441745 ||  || — || January 29, 2009 || Kitt Peak || Spacewatch || — || align=right | 1.5 km || 
|-id=746 bgcolor=#E9E9E9
| 441746 ||  || — || January 30, 2009 || Kitt Peak || Spacewatch || — || align=right | 2.2 km || 
|-id=747 bgcolor=#E9E9E9
| 441747 ||  || — || January 31, 2009 || Kitt Peak || Spacewatch || — || align=right | 1.0 km || 
|-id=748 bgcolor=#d6d6d6
| 441748 ||  || — || January 25, 2009 || Kitt Peak || Spacewatch || — || align=right | 2.3 km || 
|-id=749 bgcolor=#E9E9E9
| 441749 ||  || — || January 25, 2009 || Kitt Peak || Spacewatch || — || align=right | 1.5 km || 
|-id=750 bgcolor=#E9E9E9
| 441750 ||  || — || January 18, 2009 || Kitt Peak || Spacewatch || — || align=right | 2.5 km || 
|-id=751 bgcolor=#E9E9E9
| 441751 ||  || — || January 29, 2009 || Kitt Peak || Spacewatch || — || align=right | 2.2 km || 
|-id=752 bgcolor=#E9E9E9
| 441752 ||  || — || February 2, 2009 || Moletai || K. Černis, J. Zdanavičius || — || align=right | 1.6 km || 
|-id=753 bgcolor=#E9E9E9
| 441753 ||  || — || January 1, 2009 || Mount Lemmon || Mount Lemmon Survey || — || align=right data-sort-value="0.87" | 870 m || 
|-id=754 bgcolor=#E9E9E9
| 441754 ||  || — || November 19, 2008 || Mount Lemmon || Mount Lemmon Survey || — || align=right data-sort-value="0.98" | 980 m || 
|-id=755 bgcolor=#fefefe
| 441755 ||  || — || February 14, 2009 || La Sagra || OAM Obs. || H || align=right | 1.2 km || 
|-id=756 bgcolor=#E9E9E9
| 441756 ||  || — || February 1, 2009 || Kitt Peak || Spacewatch || — || align=right | 1.8 km || 
|-id=757 bgcolor=#E9E9E9
| 441757 ||  || — || January 15, 2009 || Kitt Peak || Spacewatch || MAR || align=right data-sort-value="0.88" | 880 m || 
|-id=758 bgcolor=#E9E9E9
| 441758 ||  || — || January 18, 2009 || Mount Lemmon || Mount Lemmon Survey || — || align=right | 2.5 km || 
|-id=759 bgcolor=#fefefe
| 441759 ||  || — || January 17, 2009 || Kitt Peak || Spacewatch || — || align=right data-sort-value="0.90" | 900 m || 
|-id=760 bgcolor=#d6d6d6
| 441760 ||  || — || February 1, 2009 || Kitt Peak || Spacewatch || — || align=right | 2.9 km || 
|-id=761 bgcolor=#E9E9E9
| 441761 ||  || — || February 2, 2009 || Mount Lemmon || Mount Lemmon Survey || — || align=right | 1.9 km || 
|-id=762 bgcolor=#fefefe
| 441762 ||  || — || February 13, 2009 || Kitt Peak || Spacewatch || H || align=right data-sort-value="0.91" | 910 m || 
|-id=763 bgcolor=#d6d6d6
| 441763 ||  || — || January 29, 2009 || Kitt Peak || Spacewatch || — || align=right | 2.2 km || 
|-id=764 bgcolor=#E9E9E9
| 441764 ||  || — || January 29, 2009 || Mount Lemmon || Mount Lemmon Survey || — || align=right | 1.2 km || 
|-id=765 bgcolor=#E9E9E9
| 441765 ||  || — || February 14, 2009 || La Sagra || OAM Obs. || BRG || align=right | 1.4 km || 
|-id=766 bgcolor=#E9E9E9
| 441766 ||  || — || December 22, 2008 || Mount Lemmon || Mount Lemmon Survey || — || align=right | 2.1 km || 
|-id=767 bgcolor=#E9E9E9
| 441767 ||  || — || January 15, 2009 || Kitt Peak || Spacewatch || (5) || align=right data-sort-value="0.67" | 670 m || 
|-id=768 bgcolor=#E9E9E9
| 441768 ||  || — || February 5, 2009 || Kitt Peak || Spacewatch || — || align=right | 1.4 km || 
|-id=769 bgcolor=#E9E9E9
| 441769 ||  || — || February 2, 2009 || Mount Lemmon || Mount Lemmon Survey || — || align=right | 2.5 km || 
|-id=770 bgcolor=#E9E9E9
| 441770 ||  || — || February 19, 2009 || Sandlot || G. Hug || WIT || align=right data-sort-value="0.97" | 970 m || 
|-id=771 bgcolor=#fefefe
| 441771 ||  || — || February 17, 2009 || Socorro || LINEAR || — || align=right data-sort-value="0.69" | 690 m || 
|-id=772 bgcolor=#E9E9E9
| 441772 ||  || — || January 15, 2009 || Kitt Peak || Spacewatch || — || align=right | 1.6 km || 
|-id=773 bgcolor=#E9E9E9
| 441773 ||  || — || December 30, 2008 || Mount Lemmon || Mount Lemmon Survey || — || align=right | 1.7 km || 
|-id=774 bgcolor=#d6d6d6
| 441774 ||  || — || January 1, 2009 || Kitt Peak || Spacewatch || — || align=right | 2.6 km || 
|-id=775 bgcolor=#E9E9E9
| 441775 ||  || — || February 20, 2009 || Kitt Peak || Spacewatch || EUN || align=right | 1.1 km || 
|-id=776 bgcolor=#E9E9E9
| 441776 ||  || — || January 16, 2009 || Kitt Peak || Spacewatch || EUN || align=right | 1.3 km || 
|-id=777 bgcolor=#E9E9E9
| 441777 ||  || — || February 22, 2009 || Socorro || LINEAR || — || align=right | 4.1 km || 
|-id=778 bgcolor=#E9E9E9
| 441778 ||  || — || January 26, 2009 || XuYi || PMO NEO || — || align=right | 2.5 km || 
|-id=779 bgcolor=#d6d6d6
| 441779 ||  || — || February 19, 2009 || Kitt Peak || Spacewatch || — || align=right | 2.3 km || 
|-id=780 bgcolor=#E9E9E9
| 441780 ||  || — || February 19, 2009 || Kitt Peak || Spacewatch || — || align=right | 1.2 km || 
|-id=781 bgcolor=#E9E9E9
| 441781 ||  || — || February 1, 2009 || Kitt Peak || Spacewatch || — || align=right | 1.7 km || 
|-id=782 bgcolor=#E9E9E9
| 441782 ||  || — || February 22, 2009 || Kitt Peak || Spacewatch || EUN || align=right | 1.1 km || 
|-id=783 bgcolor=#E9E9E9
| 441783 ||  || — || February 3, 2009 || Kitt Peak || Spacewatch || — || align=right | 2.7 km || 
|-id=784 bgcolor=#E9E9E9
| 441784 ||  || — || October 29, 2008 || Mount Lemmon || Mount Lemmon Survey || — || align=right | 1.0 km || 
|-id=785 bgcolor=#E9E9E9
| 441785 ||  || — || February 21, 2009 || Kitt Peak || Spacewatch || — || align=right | 1.6 km || 
|-id=786 bgcolor=#E9E9E9
| 441786 ||  || — || February 24, 2009 || Kitt Peak || Spacewatch || — || align=right | 2.3 km || 
|-id=787 bgcolor=#d6d6d6
| 441787 ||  || — || February 28, 2009 || Kitt Peak || Spacewatch || — || align=right | 1.4 km || 
|-id=788 bgcolor=#E9E9E9
| 441788 ||  || — || February 19, 2009 || Kitt Peak || Spacewatch || — || align=right | 2.1 km || 
|-id=789 bgcolor=#d6d6d6
| 441789 ||  || — || February 20, 2009 || Kitt Peak || Spacewatch || — || align=right | 2.5 km || 
|-id=790 bgcolor=#E9E9E9
| 441790 ||  || — || November 6, 2008 || Mount Lemmon || Mount Lemmon Survey || — || align=right | 1.3 km || 
|-id=791 bgcolor=#E9E9E9
| 441791 ||  || — || February 14, 2009 || Kitt Peak || Spacewatch || — || align=right | 1.3 km || 
|-id=792 bgcolor=#E9E9E9
| 441792 ||  || — || March 15, 2009 || Kitt Peak || Spacewatch || — || align=right | 3.1 km || 
|-id=793 bgcolor=#E9E9E9
| 441793 ||  || — || March 15, 2009 || Kitt Peak || Spacewatch || — || align=right | 2.0 km || 
|-id=794 bgcolor=#d6d6d6
| 441794 ||  || — || March 2, 2009 || Mount Lemmon || Mount Lemmon Survey || KOR || align=right | 1.2 km || 
|-id=795 bgcolor=#fefefe
| 441795 ||  || — || February 20, 2009 || Catalina || CSS || H || align=right data-sort-value="0.74" | 740 m || 
|-id=796 bgcolor=#E9E9E9
| 441796 ||  || — || October 1, 2008 || Mount Lemmon || Mount Lemmon Survey || — || align=right | 1.1 km || 
|-id=797 bgcolor=#E9E9E9
| 441797 ||  || — || February 27, 2000 || Kitt Peak || Spacewatch || — || align=right | 2.0 km || 
|-id=798 bgcolor=#d6d6d6
| 441798 ||  || — || March 21, 2009 || Catalina || CSS || — || align=right | 3.3 km || 
|-id=799 bgcolor=#E9E9E9
| 441799 ||  || — || March 21, 2009 || Catalina || CSS || — || align=right | 1.7 km || 
|-id=800 bgcolor=#d6d6d6
| 441800 ||  || — || February 1, 2009 || Mount Lemmon || Mount Lemmon Survey || — || align=right | 2.6 km || 
|}

441801–441900 

|-bgcolor=#E9E9E9
| 441801 ||  || — || December 17, 2007 || Mount Lemmon || Mount Lemmon Survey || — || align=right | 2.2 km || 
|-id=802 bgcolor=#d6d6d6
| 441802 ||  || — || March 31, 2009 || Kitt Peak || Spacewatch || — || align=right | 2.1 km || 
|-id=803 bgcolor=#E9E9E9
| 441803 ||  || — || February 29, 2004 || Kitt Peak || Spacewatch || — || align=right | 2.0 km || 
|-id=804 bgcolor=#d6d6d6
| 441804 ||  || — || March 28, 2009 || Mount Lemmon || Mount Lemmon Survey || — || align=right | 3.1 km || 
|-id=805 bgcolor=#E9E9E9
| 441805 ||  || — || October 21, 2007 || Mount Lemmon || Mount Lemmon Survey || ADE || align=right | 2.1 km || 
|-id=806 bgcolor=#d6d6d6
| 441806 ||  || — || April 2, 2009 || Mount Lemmon || Mount Lemmon Survey || — || align=right | 2.5 km || 
|-id=807 bgcolor=#d6d6d6
| 441807 ||  || — || March 26, 2009 || Mount Lemmon || Mount Lemmon Survey || — || align=right | 3.2 km || 
|-id=808 bgcolor=#d6d6d6
| 441808 ||  || — || March 2, 2009 || Kitt Peak || Spacewatch || — || align=right | 2.6 km || 
|-id=809 bgcolor=#E9E9E9
| 441809 ||  || — || April 19, 2009 || Kitt Peak || Spacewatch || — || align=right | 2.8 km || 
|-id=810 bgcolor=#E9E9E9
| 441810 ||  || — || April 22, 2009 || Mount Lemmon || Mount Lemmon Survey || — || align=right | 2.5 km || 
|-id=811 bgcolor=#d6d6d6
| 441811 ||  || — || April 20, 2009 || Mount Lemmon || Mount Lemmon Survey || — || align=right | 2.3 km || 
|-id=812 bgcolor=#d6d6d6
| 441812 ||  || — || April 20, 2009 || Kitt Peak || Spacewatch || — || align=right | 2.8 km || 
|-id=813 bgcolor=#d6d6d6
| 441813 ||  || — || May 24, 2009 || Kitt Peak || Spacewatch || — || align=right | 3.3 km || 
|-id=814 bgcolor=#d6d6d6
| 441814 ||  || — || March 31, 2009 || Mount Lemmon || Mount Lemmon Survey || EOS || align=right | 2.0 km || 
|-id=815 bgcolor=#d6d6d6
| 441815 ||  || — || April 30, 2009 || Kitt Peak || Spacewatch || Tj (2.96) || align=right | 4.2 km || 
|-id=816 bgcolor=#d6d6d6
| 441816 ||  || — || May 27, 2009 || Kitt Peak || Spacewatch || — || align=right | 2.9 km || 
|-id=817 bgcolor=#d6d6d6
| 441817 ||  || — || June 12, 2009 || Kitt Peak || Spacewatch || — || align=right | 3.9 km || 
|-id=818 bgcolor=#d6d6d6
| 441818 ||  || — || June 28, 2009 || La Sagra || OAM Obs. || — || align=right | 5.0 km || 
|-id=819 bgcolor=#d6d6d6
| 441819 ||  || — || July 11, 2009 || Siding Spring || SSS || Tj (2.95) || align=right | 4.6 km || 
|-id=820 bgcolor=#d6d6d6
| 441820 ||  || — || July 29, 2009 || La Sagra || OAM Obs. || — || align=right | 4.2 km || 
|-id=821 bgcolor=#d6d6d6
| 441821 ||  || — || July 27, 2009 || Kitt Peak || Spacewatch || — || align=right | 4.5 km || 
|-id=822 bgcolor=#d6d6d6
| 441822 ||  || — || July 28, 2009 || Kitt Peak || Spacewatch || EOS || align=right | 2.2 km || 
|-id=823 bgcolor=#FFC2E0
| 441823 ||  || — || August 18, 2009 || Kitt Peak || Spacewatch || AMO || align=right data-sort-value="0.13" | 130 m || 
|-id=824 bgcolor=#d6d6d6
| 441824 ||  || — || April 1, 2008 || Kitt Peak || Spacewatch || — || align=right | 3.4 km || 
|-id=825 bgcolor=#FFC2E0
| 441825 ||  || — || September 17, 2009 || Catalina || CSS || AMO || align=right data-sort-value="0.74" | 740 m || 
|-id=826 bgcolor=#d6d6d6
| 441826 ||  || — || April 19, 2007 || Kitt Peak || Spacewatch || VER || align=right | 2.6 km || 
|-id=827 bgcolor=#fefefe
| 441827 ||  || — || September 18, 2009 || Kitt Peak || Spacewatch || — || align=right | 1.2 km || 
|-id=828 bgcolor=#d6d6d6
| 441828 ||  || — || September 20, 2009 || Mount Lemmon || Mount Lemmon Survey || — || align=right | 2.4 km || 
|-id=829 bgcolor=#d6d6d6
| 441829 ||  || — || September 18, 2009 || Catalina || CSS || — || align=right | 4.6 km || 
|-id=830 bgcolor=#fefefe
| 441830 ||  || — || December 10, 2006 || Kitt Peak || Spacewatch || — || align=right data-sort-value="0.70" | 700 m || 
|-id=831 bgcolor=#fefefe
| 441831 ||  || — || September 25, 2009 || Mount Lemmon || Mount Lemmon Survey || — || align=right data-sort-value="0.46" | 460 m || 
|-id=832 bgcolor=#fefefe
| 441832 ||  || — || September 17, 2009 || Kitt Peak || Spacewatch || — || align=right data-sort-value="0.52" | 520 m || 
|-id=833 bgcolor=#d6d6d6
| 441833 ||  || — || September 20, 2009 || Mount Lemmon || Mount Lemmon Survey || 3:2 || align=right | 3.7 km || 
|-id=834 bgcolor=#fefefe
| 441834 ||  || — || October 1, 2009 || Mount Lemmon || Mount Lemmon Survey || — || align=right data-sort-value="0.82" | 820 m || 
|-id=835 bgcolor=#d6d6d6
| 441835 ||  || — || September 15, 2009 || Kitt Peak || Spacewatch || SYL7:4 || align=right | 5.5 km || 
|-id=836 bgcolor=#fefefe
| 441836 ||  || — || October 11, 2009 || Mount Lemmon || Mount Lemmon Survey || — || align=right data-sort-value="0.71" | 710 m || 
|-id=837 bgcolor=#fefefe
| 441837 ||  || — || October 14, 2009 || Catalina || CSS || — || align=right data-sort-value="0.61" | 610 m || 
|-id=838 bgcolor=#fefefe
| 441838 ||  || — || December 24, 2006 || Kitt Peak || Spacewatch || — || align=right data-sort-value="0.91" | 910 m || 
|-id=839 bgcolor=#d6d6d6
| 441839 ||  || — || September 20, 2009 || Mount Lemmon || Mount Lemmon Survey || 3:2 || align=right | 4.0 km || 
|-id=840 bgcolor=#fefefe
| 441840 ||  || — || October 26, 2009 || Kitt Peak || Spacewatch || — || align=right data-sort-value="0.68" | 680 m || 
|-id=841 bgcolor=#fefefe
| 441841 ||  || — || March 29, 2008 || Mount Lemmon || Mount Lemmon Survey || — || align=right data-sort-value="0.55" | 550 m || 
|-id=842 bgcolor=#fefefe
| 441842 ||  || — || November 10, 2009 || Mount Lemmon || Mount Lemmon Survey || — || align=right data-sort-value="0.89" | 890 m || 
|-id=843 bgcolor=#fefefe
| 441843 ||  || — || October 24, 2009 || Kitt Peak || Spacewatch || — || align=right data-sort-value="0.71" | 710 m || 
|-id=844 bgcolor=#fefefe
| 441844 ||  || — || November 15, 2009 || Catalina || CSS || — || align=right data-sort-value="0.81" | 810 m || 
|-id=845 bgcolor=#d6d6d6
| 441845 ||  || — || September 20, 2009 || Mount Lemmon || Mount Lemmon Survey || 3:2 || align=right | 3.6 km || 
|-id=846 bgcolor=#fefefe
| 441846 ||  || — || March 15, 2007 || Kitt Peak || Spacewatch || (6769) || align=right | 1.7 km || 
|-id=847 bgcolor=#fefefe
| 441847 ||  || — || November 9, 2009 || Kitt Peak || Spacewatch || — || align=right data-sort-value="0.90" | 900 m || 
|-id=848 bgcolor=#d6d6d6
| 441848 ||  || — || November 17, 2009 || Catalina || CSS || 3:2 || align=right | 6.0 km || 
|-id=849 bgcolor=#fefefe
| 441849 ||  || — || December 27, 2006 || Mount Lemmon || Mount Lemmon Survey || — || align=right data-sort-value="0.67" | 670 m || 
|-id=850 bgcolor=#fefefe
| 441850 ||  || — || November 18, 2009 || Kitt Peak || Spacewatch || — || align=right | 1.5 km || 
|-id=851 bgcolor=#d6d6d6
| 441851 ||  || — || November 16, 2009 || Kitt Peak || Spacewatch || 3:2 || align=right | 4.7 km || 
|-id=852 bgcolor=#fefefe
| 441852 ||  || — || November 17, 2009 || Kitt Peak || Spacewatch || — || align=right data-sort-value="0.65" | 650 m || 
|-id=853 bgcolor=#fefefe
| 441853 ||  || — || November 10, 2009 || Kitt Peak || Spacewatch || — || align=right data-sort-value="0.54" | 540 m || 
|-id=854 bgcolor=#fefefe
| 441854 ||  || — || November 20, 2009 || Mount Lemmon || Mount Lemmon Survey || — || align=right | 1.3 km || 
|-id=855 bgcolor=#fefefe
| 441855 ||  || — || September 21, 2009 || Mount Lemmon || Mount Lemmon Survey || critical || align=right data-sort-value="0.52" | 520 m || 
|-id=856 bgcolor=#fefefe
| 441856 ||  || — || October 25, 2009 || Kitt Peak || Spacewatch || V || align=right data-sort-value="0.65" | 650 m || 
|-id=857 bgcolor=#fefefe
| 441857 ||  || — || November 21, 2009 || Kitt Peak || Spacewatch || — || align=right | 1.4 km || 
|-id=858 bgcolor=#fefefe
| 441858 ||  || — || October 24, 2009 || Kitt Peak || Spacewatch || — || align=right data-sort-value="0.68" | 680 m || 
|-id=859 bgcolor=#fefefe
| 441859 ||  || — || December 13, 2006 || Kitt Peak || Spacewatch || — || align=right data-sort-value="0.64" | 640 m || 
|-id=860 bgcolor=#fefefe
| 441860 ||  || — || November 24, 2009 || Kitt Peak || Spacewatch || — || align=right data-sort-value="0.84" | 840 m || 
|-id=861 bgcolor=#fefefe
| 441861 ||  || — || November 16, 2009 || Kitt Peak || Spacewatch || — || align=right data-sort-value="0.59" | 590 m || 
|-id=862 bgcolor=#fefefe
| 441862 ||  || — || November 25, 2009 || Kitt Peak || Spacewatch || — || align=right data-sort-value="0.52" | 520 m || 
|-id=863 bgcolor=#fefefe
| 441863 ||  || — || November 18, 2009 || Kitt Peak || Spacewatch || — || align=right data-sort-value="0.89" | 890 m || 
|-id=864 bgcolor=#fefefe
| 441864 ||  || — || November 26, 2009 || Mount Lemmon || Mount Lemmon Survey || — || align=right data-sort-value="0.79" | 790 m || 
|-id=865 bgcolor=#E9E9E9
| 441865 ||  || — || December 17, 2009 || Mount Lemmon || Mount Lemmon Survey || — || align=right | 1.2 km || 
|-id=866 bgcolor=#fefefe
| 441866 ||  || — || December 18, 2009 || Mount Lemmon || Mount Lemmon Survey || — || align=right | 1.6 km || 
|-id=867 bgcolor=#fefefe
| 441867 ||  || — || December 18, 2009 || Mount Lemmon || Mount Lemmon Survey || — || align=right | 1.4 km || 
|-id=868 bgcolor=#fefefe
| 441868 ||  || — || December 16, 2009 || Kitt Peak || Spacewatch || V || align=right data-sort-value="0.70" | 700 m || 
|-id=869 bgcolor=#fefefe
| 441869 ||  || — || November 17, 2009 || Mount Lemmon || Mount Lemmon Survey || — || align=right data-sort-value="0.88" | 880 m || 
|-id=870 bgcolor=#fefefe
| 441870 ||  || — || December 26, 2009 || Kitt Peak || Spacewatch || MAS || align=right data-sort-value="0.67" | 670 m || 
|-id=871 bgcolor=#fefefe
| 441871 ||  || — || November 21, 2009 || Mount Lemmon || Mount Lemmon Survey || — || align=right data-sort-value="0.74" | 740 m || 
|-id=872 bgcolor=#fefefe
| 441872 ||  || — || January 9, 2010 || Tzec Maun || D. Chestnov, A. Novichonok || — || align=right | 1.7 km || 
|-id=873 bgcolor=#fefefe
| 441873 ||  || — || January 8, 2010 || Kitt Peak || Spacewatch || NYS || align=right data-sort-value="0.56" | 560 m || 
|-id=874 bgcolor=#fefefe
| 441874 ||  || — || January 6, 2010 || Catalina || CSS || — || align=right data-sort-value="0.75" | 750 m || 
|-id=875 bgcolor=#FA8072
| 441875 ||  || — || August 29, 2006 || Catalina || CSS || — || align=right | 1.6 km || 
|-id=876 bgcolor=#E9E9E9
| 441876 ||  || — || January 15, 2010 || WISE || WISE || — || align=right | 3.0 km || 
|-id=877 bgcolor=#E9E9E9
| 441877 ||  || — || April 21, 2006 || Catalina || CSS || — || align=right | 3.2 km || 
|-id=878 bgcolor=#E9E9E9
| 441878 ||  || — || January 16, 2010 || WISE || WISE || — || align=right | 2.6 km || 
|-id=879 bgcolor=#E9E9E9
| 441879 ||  || — || January 23, 2010 || WISE || WISE || — || align=right | 2.5 km || 
|-id=880 bgcolor=#E9E9E9
| 441880 ||  || — || February 8, 2010 || WISE || WISE || — || align=right | 4.5 km || 
|-id=881 bgcolor=#fefefe
| 441881 ||  || — || February 9, 2010 || Catalina || CSS || — || align=right | 2.2 km || 
|-id=882 bgcolor=#E9E9E9
| 441882 ||  || — || December 1, 2008 || Kitt Peak || Spacewatch || — || align=right | 2.6 km || 
|-id=883 bgcolor=#fefefe
| 441883 ||  || — || February 13, 2010 || Mount Lemmon || Mount Lemmon Survey || CLA || align=right | 1.6 km || 
|-id=884 bgcolor=#fefefe
| 441884 ||  || — || July 29, 2008 || Kitt Peak || Spacewatch || — || align=right data-sort-value="0.90" | 900 m || 
|-id=885 bgcolor=#E9E9E9
| 441885 ||  || — || November 20, 2008 || Mount Lemmon || Mount Lemmon Survey || — || align=right | 1.4 km || 
|-id=886 bgcolor=#E9E9E9
| 441886 ||  || — || February 14, 2010 || Kitt Peak || Spacewatch || EUN || align=right | 1.1 km || 
|-id=887 bgcolor=#E9E9E9
| 441887 ||  || — || February 14, 2010 || Kitt Peak || Spacewatch || — || align=right | 2.0 km || 
|-id=888 bgcolor=#E9E9E9
| 441888 ||  || — || February 15, 2010 || Kitt Peak || Spacewatch || — || align=right | 2.3 km || 
|-id=889 bgcolor=#E9E9E9
| 441889 ||  || — || May 26, 1998 || Kitt Peak || Spacewatch || ADE || align=right | 1.5 km || 
|-id=890 bgcolor=#fefefe
| 441890 ||  || — || February 9, 2010 || Kitt Peak || Spacewatch || — || align=right data-sort-value="0.85" | 850 m || 
|-id=891 bgcolor=#fefefe
| 441891 ||  || — || May 23, 2003 || Kitt Peak || Spacewatch || — || align=right data-sort-value="0.87" | 870 m || 
|-id=892 bgcolor=#E9E9E9
| 441892 ||  || — || October 6, 2008 || Mount Lemmon || Mount Lemmon Survey || — || align=right | 1.6 km || 
|-id=893 bgcolor=#E9E9E9
| 441893 ||  || — || February 14, 2010 || Haleakala || Pan-STARRS || — || align=right data-sort-value="0.88" | 880 m || 
|-id=894 bgcolor=#E9E9E9
| 441894 ||  || — || February 19, 2010 || WISE || WISE || — || align=right | 3.4 km || 
|-id=895 bgcolor=#E9E9E9
| 441895 ||  || — || March 1, 2010 || WISE || WISE || — || align=right | 3.0 km || 
|-id=896 bgcolor=#E9E9E9
| 441896 ||  || — || February 15, 2010 || Kitt Peak || Spacewatch || — || align=right | 1.1 km || 
|-id=897 bgcolor=#E9E9E9
| 441897 ||  || — || March 4, 2010 || Kitt Peak || Spacewatch || EUN || align=right | 1.0 km || 
|-id=898 bgcolor=#E9E9E9
| 441898 ||  || — || March 4, 2010 || Kitt Peak || Spacewatch || — || align=right | 2.0 km || 
|-id=899 bgcolor=#E9E9E9
| 441899 ||  || — || March 4, 2010 || Kitt Peak || Spacewatch || — || align=right data-sort-value="0.72" | 720 m || 
|-id=900 bgcolor=#E9E9E9
| 441900 ||  || — || March 12, 2010 || Mount Lemmon || Mount Lemmon Survey || — || align=right | 2.1 km || 
|}

441901–442000 

|-bgcolor=#E9E9E9
| 441901 ||  || — || February 19, 2010 || Mount Lemmon || Mount Lemmon Survey || — || align=right data-sort-value="0.99" | 990 m || 
|-id=902 bgcolor=#E9E9E9
| 441902 ||  || — || February 19, 2010 || Mount Lemmon || Mount Lemmon Survey || — || align=right data-sort-value="0.90" | 900 m || 
|-id=903 bgcolor=#fefefe
| 441903 ||  || — || March 14, 2010 || Mount Lemmon || Mount Lemmon Survey || — || align=right data-sort-value="0.83" | 830 m || 
|-id=904 bgcolor=#E9E9E9
| 441904 ||  || — || September 14, 2007 || Mount Lemmon || Mount Lemmon Survey || — || align=right | 1.1 km || 
|-id=905 bgcolor=#fefefe
| 441905 ||  || — || December 17, 2009 || Kitt Peak || Spacewatch || — || align=right | 2.6 km || 
|-id=906 bgcolor=#E9E9E9
| 441906 ||  || — || March 13, 2010 || Kitt Peak || Spacewatch || JUN || align=right data-sort-value="0.97" | 970 m || 
|-id=907 bgcolor=#E9E9E9
| 441907 ||  || — || March 15, 2010 || Kitt Peak || Spacewatch || JUN || align=right | 1.1 km || 
|-id=908 bgcolor=#E9E9E9
| 441908 ||  || — || March 12, 2010 || Kitt Peak || Spacewatch || — || align=right | 1.7 km || 
|-id=909 bgcolor=#E9E9E9
| 441909 ||  || — || April 24, 2006 || Kitt Peak || Spacewatch || (1547)critical || align=right | 1.4 km || 
|-id=910 bgcolor=#E9E9E9
| 441910 ||  || — || March 17, 2010 || Catalina || CSS || — || align=right | 1.7 km || 
|-id=911 bgcolor=#E9E9E9
| 441911 ||  || — || March 18, 2010 || Mount Lemmon || Mount Lemmon Survey || — || align=right | 2.0 km || 
|-id=912 bgcolor=#E9E9E9
| 441912 ||  || — || March 19, 2010 || Catalina || CSS || — || align=right | 1.7 km || 
|-id=913 bgcolor=#E9E9E9
| 441913 ||  || — || August 10, 2007 || Kitt Peak || Spacewatch || (5) || align=right data-sort-value="0.67" | 670 m || 
|-id=914 bgcolor=#d6d6d6
| 441914 ||  || — || March 16, 2010 || Catalina || CSS || BRA || align=right | 1.9 km || 
|-id=915 bgcolor=#d6d6d6
| 441915 ||  || — || January 24, 2007 || Mount Lemmon || Mount Lemmon Survey || — || align=right | 4.6 km || 
|-id=916 bgcolor=#E9E9E9
| 441916 ||  || — || April 11, 2010 || Kitt Peak || Spacewatch || — || align=right | 1.1 km || 
|-id=917 bgcolor=#E9E9E9
| 441917 ||  || — || February 16, 2010 || Mount Lemmon || Mount Lemmon Survey || — || align=right | 2.4 km || 
|-id=918 bgcolor=#E9E9E9
| 441918 ||  || — || May 25, 2006 || Kitt Peak || Spacewatch || — || align=right | 1.2 km || 
|-id=919 bgcolor=#E9E9E9
| 441919 ||  || — || April 9, 2010 || Mount Lemmon || Mount Lemmon Survey || EUN || align=right data-sort-value="0.96" | 960 m || 
|-id=920 bgcolor=#E9E9E9
| 441920 ||  || — || January 16, 2010 || WISE || WISE || — || align=right | 2.3 km || 
|-id=921 bgcolor=#E9E9E9
| 441921 ||  || — || April 16, 2010 || WISE || WISE || — || align=right | 3.8 km || 
|-id=922 bgcolor=#d6d6d6
| 441922 ||  || — || April 23, 2010 || WISE || WISE || — || align=right | 4.0 km || 
|-id=923 bgcolor=#d6d6d6
| 441923 ||  || — || April 27, 2010 || WISE || WISE || — || align=right | 5.2 km || 
|-id=924 bgcolor=#d6d6d6
| 441924 ||  || — || May 3, 2010 || Kitt Peak || Spacewatch || — || align=right | 2.5 km || 
|-id=925 bgcolor=#E9E9E9
| 441925 ||  || — || January 30, 2010 || WISE || WISE || — || align=right | 1.6 km || 
|-id=926 bgcolor=#d6d6d6
| 441926 ||  || — || May 2, 2010 || WISE || WISE || — || align=right | 3.0 km || 
|-id=927 bgcolor=#E9E9E9
| 441927 ||  || — || January 19, 2005 || Kitt Peak || Spacewatch || — || align=right | 1.1 km || 
|-id=928 bgcolor=#E9E9E9
| 441928 ||  || — || May 5, 2010 || La Sagra || OAM Obs. || — || align=right | 2.3 km || 
|-id=929 bgcolor=#E9E9E9
| 441929 ||  || — || May 4, 2010 || Catalina || CSS || — || align=right | 1.7 km || 
|-id=930 bgcolor=#E9E9E9
| 441930 ||  || — || April 8, 2010 || Kitt Peak || Spacewatch || — || align=right | 1.2 km || 
|-id=931 bgcolor=#E9E9E9
| 441931 ||  || — || May 4, 2010 || Kitt Peak || Spacewatch || — || align=right | 1.9 km || 
|-id=932 bgcolor=#E9E9E9
| 441932 ||  || — || May 4, 2010 || Kitt Peak || Spacewatch || — || align=right | 1.2 km || 
|-id=933 bgcolor=#E9E9E9
| 441933 ||  || — || May 7, 2010 || Kitt Peak || Spacewatch || — || align=right | 1.8 km || 
|-id=934 bgcolor=#E9E9E9
| 441934 ||  || — || May 8, 2010 || Mount Lemmon || Mount Lemmon Survey || — || align=right | 2.1 km || 
|-id=935 bgcolor=#E9E9E9
| 441935 ||  || — || February 10, 2010 || WISE || WISE || — || align=right | 2.2 km || 
|-id=936 bgcolor=#fefefe
| 441936 ||  || — || April 2, 2006 || Kitt Peak || Spacewatch || — || align=right data-sort-value="0.97" | 970 m || 
|-id=937 bgcolor=#E9E9E9
| 441937 ||  || — || March 8, 2005 || Kitt Peak || Spacewatch || — || align=right | 1.6 km || 
|-id=938 bgcolor=#E9E9E9
| 441938 ||  || — || May 9, 2010 || Mount Lemmon || Mount Lemmon Survey || — || align=right | 2.0 km || 
|-id=939 bgcolor=#d6d6d6
| 441939 ||  || — || May 14, 2010 || WISE || WISE || Tj (2.98) || align=right | 5.1 km || 
|-id=940 bgcolor=#E9E9E9
| 441940 ||  || — || April 8, 2010 || Kitt Peak || Spacewatch || — || align=right | 1.5 km || 
|-id=941 bgcolor=#E9E9E9
| 441941 ||  || — || May 7, 2010 || Mount Lemmon || Mount Lemmon Survey || 526 || align=right | 2.2 km || 
|-id=942 bgcolor=#d6d6d6
| 441942 ||  || — || May 19, 2010 || WISE || WISE || — || align=right | 2.4 km || 
|-id=943 bgcolor=#E9E9E9
| 441943 ||  || — || May 19, 2010 || Catalina || CSS || — || align=right | 2.3 km || 
|-id=944 bgcolor=#d6d6d6
| 441944 ||  || — || May 25, 2010 || WISE || WISE || — || align=right | 2.4 km || 
|-id=945 bgcolor=#d6d6d6
| 441945 ||  || — || May 25, 2010 || WISE || WISE || — || align=right | 3.7 km || 
|-id=946 bgcolor=#d6d6d6
| 441946 ||  || — || May 28, 2010 || WISE || WISE || — || align=right | 4.8 km || 
|-id=947 bgcolor=#d6d6d6
| 441947 ||  || — || June 2, 2010 || WISE || WISE || — || align=right | 2.6 km || 
|-id=948 bgcolor=#d6d6d6
| 441948 ||  || — || June 2, 2010 || WISE || WISE || NAE || align=right | 3.1 km || 
|-id=949 bgcolor=#E9E9E9
| 441949 ||  || — || March 11, 2005 || Mount Lemmon || Mount Lemmon Survey || — || align=right | 2.2 km || 
|-id=950 bgcolor=#FA8072
| 441950 ||  || — || May 5, 2010 || Mount Lemmon || Mount Lemmon Survey || H || align=right data-sort-value="0.77" | 770 m || 
|-id=951 bgcolor=#d6d6d6
| 441951 ||  || — || June 9, 2010 || WISE || WISE || — || align=right | 2.0 km || 
|-id=952 bgcolor=#FFC2E0
| 441952 ||  || — || June 8, 2010 || WISE || WISE || AMOcritical || align=right | 2.2 km || 
|-id=953 bgcolor=#d6d6d6
| 441953 ||  || — || June 9, 2010 || WISE || WISE || — || align=right | 3.9 km || 
|-id=954 bgcolor=#d6d6d6
| 441954 ||  || — || June 10, 2010 || WISE || WISE || — || align=right | 3.7 km || 
|-id=955 bgcolor=#d6d6d6
| 441955 ||  || — || June 10, 2010 || WISE || WISE || — || align=right | 3.9 km || 
|-id=956 bgcolor=#d6d6d6
| 441956 ||  || — || June 11, 2010 || WISE || WISE || — || align=right | 3.3 km || 
|-id=957 bgcolor=#d6d6d6
| 441957 ||  || — || June 13, 2010 || WISE || WISE || — || align=right | 2.7 km || 
|-id=958 bgcolor=#d6d6d6
| 441958 ||  || — || June 13, 2010 || WISE || WISE || THM || align=right | 2.6 km || 
|-id=959 bgcolor=#d6d6d6
| 441959 ||  || — || June 14, 2010 || WISE || WISE || — || align=right | 3.6 km || 
|-id=960 bgcolor=#d6d6d6
| 441960 ||  || — || June 14, 2010 || WISE || WISE || — || align=right | 2.4 km || 
|-id=961 bgcolor=#d6d6d6
| 441961 ||  || — || June 16, 2010 || WISE || WISE || — || align=right | 4.9 km || 
|-id=962 bgcolor=#d6d6d6
| 441962 ||  || — || October 12, 2005 || Kitt Peak || Spacewatch || — || align=right | 2.6 km || 
|-id=963 bgcolor=#d6d6d6
| 441963 ||  || — || June 18, 2010 || WISE || WISE || EOS || align=right | 3.3 km || 
|-id=964 bgcolor=#d6d6d6
| 441964 ||  || — || December 5, 2005 || Kitt Peak || Spacewatch || — || align=right | 3.5 km || 
|-id=965 bgcolor=#d6d6d6
| 441965 ||  || — || October 22, 2005 || Kitt Peak || Spacewatch || — || align=right | 3.4 km || 
|-id=966 bgcolor=#d6d6d6
| 441966 ||  || — || June 21, 2010 || WISE || WISE || — || align=right | 4.2 km || 
|-id=967 bgcolor=#d6d6d6
| 441967 ||  || — || October 29, 2005 || Kitt Peak || Spacewatch || — || align=right | 2.4 km || 
|-id=968 bgcolor=#d6d6d6
| 441968 ||  || — || December 25, 2006 || Kitt Peak || Spacewatch || — || align=right | 3.0 km || 
|-id=969 bgcolor=#d6d6d6
| 441969 ||  || — || June 25, 2010 || WISE || WISE || — || align=right | 2.9 km || 
|-id=970 bgcolor=#d6d6d6
| 441970 ||  || — || June 25, 2010 || WISE || WISE || — || align=right | 3.4 km || 
|-id=971 bgcolor=#d6d6d6
| 441971 ||  || — || June 26, 2010 || WISE || WISE || — || align=right | 3.2 km || 
|-id=972 bgcolor=#d6d6d6
| 441972 ||  || — || June 26, 2010 || WISE || WISE || — || align=right | 2.1 km || 
|-id=973 bgcolor=#d6d6d6
| 441973 ||  || — || June 27, 2010 || WISE || WISE || — || align=right | 4.6 km || 
|-id=974 bgcolor=#d6d6d6
| 441974 ||  || — || June 28, 2010 || WISE || WISE || — || align=right | 3.4 km || 
|-id=975 bgcolor=#d6d6d6
| 441975 ||  || — || November 27, 2006 || Mount Lemmon || Mount Lemmon Survey || — || align=right | 4.1 km || 
|-id=976 bgcolor=#d6d6d6
| 441976 ||  || — || June 30, 2010 || WISE || WISE || — || align=right | 2.9 km || 
|-id=977 bgcolor=#d6d6d6
| 441977 ||  || — || June 30, 2010 || WISE || WISE || — || align=right | 2.4 km || 
|-id=978 bgcolor=#d6d6d6
| 441978 ||  || — || June 30, 2010 || WISE || WISE || — || align=right | 3.0 km || 
|-id=979 bgcolor=#d6d6d6
| 441979 ||  || — || July 6, 2010 || WISE || WISE || — || align=right | 2.4 km || 
|-id=980 bgcolor=#d6d6d6
| 441980 ||  || — || July 6, 2010 || WISE || WISE || — || align=right | 4.7 km || 
|-id=981 bgcolor=#d6d6d6
| 441981 ||  || — || October 29, 2005 || Catalina || CSS || EMA || align=right | 3.5 km || 
|-id=982 bgcolor=#d6d6d6
| 441982 ||  || — || October 25, 2005 || Catalina || CSS || — || align=right | 3.8 km || 
|-id=983 bgcolor=#d6d6d6
| 441983 ||  || — || October 26, 2005 || Kitt Peak || Spacewatch || — || align=right | 3.6 km || 
|-id=984 bgcolor=#d6d6d6
| 441984 ||  || — || July 9, 2010 || WISE || WISE || — || align=right | 3.7 km || 
|-id=985 bgcolor=#d6d6d6
| 441985 ||  || — || July 10, 2010 || WISE || WISE || — || align=right | 2.0 km || 
|-id=986 bgcolor=#d6d6d6
| 441986 ||  || — || July 11, 2010 || WISE || WISE || — || align=right | 4.9 km || 
|-id=987 bgcolor=#FFC2E0
| 441987 ||  || — || July 14, 2010 || WISE || WISE || APOPHA || align=right data-sort-value="0.23" | 230 m || 
|-id=988 bgcolor=#d6d6d6
| 441988 ||  || — || July 14, 2010 || WISE || WISE || — || align=right | 4.3 km || 
|-id=989 bgcolor=#d6d6d6
| 441989 ||  || — || July 16, 2010 || WISE || WISE || — || align=right | 4.6 km || 
|-id=990 bgcolor=#d6d6d6
| 441990 ||  || — || July 1, 2010 || WISE || WISE || — || align=right | 4.3 km || 
|-id=991 bgcolor=#d6d6d6
| 441991 ||  || — || July 1, 2010 || WISE || WISE || — || align=right | 4.7 km || 
|-id=992 bgcolor=#d6d6d6
| 441992 ||  || — || July 1, 2010 || WISE || WISE || — || align=right | 2.3 km || 
|-id=993 bgcolor=#d6d6d6
| 441993 ||  || — || October 30, 2005 || Kitt Peak || Spacewatch || — || align=right | 2.5 km || 
|-id=994 bgcolor=#d6d6d6
| 441994 ||  || — || July 12, 2010 || WISE || WISE || — || align=right | 3.4 km || 
|-id=995 bgcolor=#d6d6d6
| 441995 ||  || — || February 21, 2007 || Mount Lemmon || Mount Lemmon Survey || — || align=right | 3.6 km || 
|-id=996 bgcolor=#d6d6d6
| 441996 ||  || — || July 16, 2010 || WISE || WISE || — || align=right | 4.7 km || 
|-id=997 bgcolor=#d6d6d6
| 441997 ||  || — || November 1, 2005 || Anderson Mesa || LONEOS || — || align=right | 2.7 km || 
|-id=998 bgcolor=#d6d6d6
| 441998 ||  || — || July 16, 2010 || WISE || WISE || — || align=right | 2.4 km || 
|-id=999 bgcolor=#d6d6d6
| 441999 ||  || — || March 18, 2007 || Kitt Peak || Spacewatch || — || align=right | 3.6 km || 
|-id=000 bgcolor=#d6d6d6
| 442000 ||  || — || July 17, 2010 || WISE || WISE || EOS || align=right | 3.2 km || 
|}

References

External links 
 Discovery Circumstances: Numbered Minor Planets (440001)–(445000) (IAU Minor Planet Center)

0441